DC's Stargirl, or simply Stargirl, is an American superhero television series created by Geoff Johns that premiered on streaming service DC Universe. It is based on the DC Comics superhero Courtney Whitmore created by Johns and Lee Moder. The series follows high school student Courtney Whitmore who discovers the cosmic staff and becomes the inspiration for a new generation of superheroes who become the Justice Society of America.

This page lists the characters that appear in this show.

Overview
Legend
 = Main cast (credited)
 = Recurring cast (4+)
 = Guest cast (1–3)

Main characters

Courtney Whitmore / Stargirl

Courtney Elizabeth Whitmore (portrayed by Brec Bassinger and Maizie Smith portrays a five-year old Courtney) is a high school student from Los Angeles who finds a powerful weapon, the Cosmic Staff and becomes the superheroine Stargirl. As Stargirl, she also becomes the leader of the second incarnation of the Justice Society of America (JSA).

Courtney was born and raised in Valley Village, California, to a single working mother, Barbara Whitmore. Barbara had an ongoing relationship with Sam Kurtis, though he was constantly in and out of their lives from the time Courtney was born. Courtney herself only met Sam a handful of times, but still cared deeply for him. When she was four, Sam Kurtis gifted her one of the lockets his mother had given him. He placed a photo of himself in the locket so Courtney would also have him with her. They spent Christmas together in a slew of fun and childlike games. She cherished the locket and wore it well into her teen years.

A year later on Christmas Eve 2010, Sam was scheduled to meet a now five-year-old Courtney to celebrate the holidays. However, he never arrived and vanished that night and the Whitmore's never saw or heard from him again. A distraught Courtney waited for Sam all night with a special gift for him. Barbara dedicated nearly two years looking for Sam for the sake of their daughter, but eventually gave up. Courtney persevered and became a gymnast, began practicing martial arts where she learned incredible fighting skills, and reached at least a blue belt. She was also very advanced in her gymnast career, being the best on her team at Sherman High. She had a strong circle of friends in California.

In the first season, ten years ago on Christmas Eve, a five-year-old Courtney Whitmore waited for her father to arrive, only to be disappointed once again when he didn't. Her single mother Barbara Whitmore leaves for work but tells her daughter to focus on the positives, such as spending the holiday with her close friend Mary.

In the present day, Courtney packs her room in California to travel across the country with her new step-father, Pat Dugan, and stepbrother Mike Dugan, to the small town of Blue Valley, Nebraska, where her mother has secured a new job. The move is against Courtney's wishes but she does her best to try and get along with Pat for her mother's sake.

Her first day at Blue Valley High is met with obstacles as she makes an enemy of mean girl Cindy Burman and is ostracized to the loser table by Paula Brooks, forced to sit with the talkative Beth Chapel, social outcast Yolanda Montez, and delinquent Rick Harris. After standing up for Yolanda against a cruel jock named Henry King Jr. who she shoved into a passing lunch lady, Courtney is dragged away by Principal Anaya Bowin who also scolds Cindy for using a profanity on Courtney in her presence. She returns to her new house where Mike has plans with his friends while she is having trouble fitting in. Her annoyance over the day and Pat trying to bond with her causes her to snap that he isn't her father. She runs to the basement where her anger turns to curiosity when she finds boxes of superhero paraphernalia in Pat's things. She learns from a series of photographs that Pat was a hero named Stripesey, the famed Starman's sidekick, and a member of the Justice Society of America. She also finds a magical staff that glows in her presence. When she picks it up, the staff whirs to life and displays its larger-than-life attributes. The staff has a mind of its own and takes her on a nightly adventure, where she learns that the staff grants her powers such as flight, cosmic blasts, and allows her to perform gymnastics feats. The staff brings her to a drive-in where she once again encounters Henry Jr, this time he is heckling other movie watchers. To teach him a lesson she attempts to poke holes in his tires but the staff, wanting more, shoots a cosmic blast at the car causing it to blow up. She engages in a fight with Henry and barely wins before flying back to her home. She is confronted by a worried Pat who tells her about his life as a sidekick, and that his best friend Starman, Sylvester Pemberton, was murdered during a fight. He explains that the staff only ever worked for Starman, prompting Courtney to see a resemblance between her father and Starman. Now believing that she is Starman's daughter and that this is her destiny, she convinces Pat to help her be a hero.

Things take a turn for Courtney when the staff takes her on a bonding exercise that results in an unpleasant meeting with Injustice Society of America villain Brainwave. She is rescued by Pat, who operates a massive robot called S.T.R.I.P.E. He once again warns her of the dangers of being a hero and how Brainwave was responsible for the deaths of many JSA members, though it was Icicle who ultimately killed Starman. She learns about surviving member Rex Tyler, who operated as Hourman, and how Rex was murdered a few years after the JSA were defeated. Pat stresses the importance of keeping her identity a secret to protect her loved ones. She decides to steal Starman's old suit and turns it into a suit fit for herself.

In season two, Stargirl and the JSA go up against Shiv's Injustice Unlimited as well as Eclipso. During the final battle, Eclipso nearly takes control of Stargirl until a revived Sylvester Pemberton helps her overcome Eclipso.

In season three, Courtney and Sylvester agree to a joint custody of the Cosmic Staff where he can use it while she is in school. She and the JSA end up in a murder mystery when Gambler was found dead outside his trailer. Sylvester was able to teach Courtney some of his moves. Courtney later witnesses Cameron's emerging cryokinesis and agrees to help him in secret. This would later be revealed to the rest of the JSA by Cindy. Shade later returned to pick up Courtney where he took her and Pat to the basement of the Helix Institute for Youth Rehabilitation where they meet up with Jennie. She and Pat learn that Jennie's brother Todd is in the building. When they find the room that Todd is in, Courtney is knocked back by the energies unleashed the moment Jennie touched Todd. She would later meet Mister Bones and persuade him to not only keep his patients hiding, but to let Jennie helpd Todd. This tactic work. Nurse Louise Love denied any knowledge of spying on the JSA stating that they just did their research. After Shade takes Jennie and Todd to meet up with Sandy Hawkins in New York, Courtney and Pat take the bus back to Blue Valley as she plans to make up with Yolanda and Rick while wondering who was spying on them. After gaining the forgivness of Yolanda, Beth, and Rick, Courtney decides to tell Cameron about his father. Before she can finish it, Rick attacks the house and fights Cameron while Yolanda and Beth fight Lily and Sofus with Artemis' aid. The fight ends when an injured Sofus mentioned to Cameron that Jordan being consumed by his bad plans is what killed him. When Cameron asks Courtney who killed his father, Courtney covered up Mike's actions by stating that she did it which puts a strain on their relationship. She was also present when Pat and Sylvester told everyone about Ultra-Humanite. Courtney would also find out that Icicle is still alive. She and the JSA engage in battle with Icicle's family as Icicle is repelled by his son. After Cameron disappears to get help for his grandfather, Courtney visits Rebecca Sharpe to give her the letter from her father. Later that night, Courtney is visited by Cameron asking if Courtney was telling the truth that she can help him.

10 years later, Shade mentions that Stargirl is now operating as Starwoman.

Yolanda Montez / Wildcat II

Yolanda Montez (portrayed by Yvette Monreal) is a once popular student at Blue Valley High until a scandal made her an outcast and a disgrace to her Catholic parents. A skilled boxer, she becomes one of Courtney's friends and a member of the new JSA as the new Wildcat.

Yolanda Montez was born and raised in Blue Valley, Nebraska, to a conservative and religious family. She was raised by her mother Maria and father Juan. She also lives with her cousin Alex and her grandmother. She attended Blue Valley schools and frequently went to church with her family, was outgoing, and had a strong social life.

Yolanda then attended Blue Valley High School, where she was popular and attentive with big dreams. She attended church with her family and was voted most outgoing at BVHS alongside her football-playing boyfriend, Henry King Jr.. In 2019, she ran for class president and was supported by her doting parents, grandmother, and younger cousin. She had been in a relationship with Henry King Jr. for quite some time and believed they were serious. Her classmate and presidential rival Cindy Burman, was jealous of Yolanda's relationship with Henry.

One night, Henry asked Yolanda to send him revealing photos of herself. She was hesitant at first but eventually did send him a topless photo. The next day, Henry showed off the images to his friends while Yolanda discussed things with Principal Bowin. Cindy grabbed Henry's phone long enough to see the messages, though he quickly grabbed it back. At the school assembly, Cindy sent the pictures of Yolanda to the entire student body and faculty. Yolanda was humiliated and disgraced by her family. Her relationship with Henry fell apart and she faced serious consequences by her religious parents. She was grounded until Maria and Juan said otherwise and her phone privileges taken away. They stopped bringing her to church and made it known how Yolanda had disgraced the Montez name. At school, she was dubbed the school slut.

In the first season, in the crowded cafeteria at her usual table, Yolanda is silently eating her salad, paying no attention to fellow students and table companions, Rick Tyler and Beth Chapel. They are suddenly joined by new-girl Courtney Whitmore. Courtney introduces herself and Beth warmly responds while Yolanda continues to ignore Courtney's presence. When Courtney tries to converse with the group Yolanda stays silent along with everyone else. Beth informs Courtney that the people at the table aren't friends and are losers. Yolanda merely looks up at Beth and barely reacts when Rick sulks out of the cafeteria. The trio is soon joined by Henry King Jr. and two of his football friends. Two boys lean on the table to Yolanda's left, while Henry leans close to Yolanda's right. She leans away from Henry, visibly uncomfortable. Henry tauntingly asks her if she has any new pictures of herself that she would like to share with them. Courtney tells him to leave Yolanda alone, much to Yolanda's surprise. Yolanda incredulously witnesses a struggle between Courtney and Henry that results in Principal Bowen dragging Courtney away to deal with her.

Montez later takes up Grant's former costumed identity of Wildcat, at the request of Stargirl, to help rebuild the Justice Society. After forgiving Henry before he was killed by his father Brainwave, Montez would later avenge him by killing the latter.

In season two, Montez takes up work as a part-time waitress at Richie's Diner under Maria Carmen Saravia, but suffers from PTSD as a result of her killing Brainwave. Her PTSD is made worse by Eclipso who made her see illusions of Henry and Brainwave. This eventually leads her to quit being Wildcat, though she later agrees to temporarily return to help the Justice Society defeat Eclipso. After Eclipso is defeated, Yolanda decides to remain with the Justice Society as Cindy approaches her wanting to make amends.

In season three, Montez and Burman are still at each other's necks while noting that her parents have been finding out that she has been sneaking out of the house and threatening to transfer her to a boarding school. Wildcat ends up in a murder mystery when Gambler is found dead outside his trailer. When Yolanda persuades her mother to let her handle the late shifts, Maria states to her that her tips go to her college fund and that she's only allowing her to do it because Juan lost his job. Wildcat later breaks into Cindy's house and finds Gambler's laptop under her bed. After Beth downloads the information, Wildcat sneaks back into Cindy's house to put it back only to be caught by Cindy which led to a cat fight that Rick joins in on. After seeing the scales on Cindy's arm as Cindy also reveals that Courtney is seeing Cameron, Yolanda and Rick lash out at Courtney. While working at Richie's Diner, Yolanda is told by Maria Carmen Saravia that her mother wants to speak to her. Yolanda is told by her mother that she finally reached Yolanda during one of her late shifts and has gotten suspicious enough for her to arrange a visit to Father Thomas tomorrow as the call is interrupted by a blackout. After searching her home for any hidden cameras, Yolanda is confronted by a more suspicious Maria who demands to know the reason behind her secret activity while stating that she's lucky her father didn't catch her. When Yolanda asks her mother to trust her, Maria states that she can't after what she has done and gives her the option to either show her what is on her cell phone or move out. Yolanda went with the latter and arrived at the Whitmore-Dugan House as Barbara and Mike learned what happened. She later forgives Courtney. When a signal was traced to the Mahkent family's house, Yolanda engaged Lily in battle with the fight ending in a draw. Yolanda was present when Pat and Sylvester told everyone about Ultra-Humanite. She later briefly called her mom to tell her that she only lied to protect her. After the battle against Icicle's family, Yolanda called up her mom again still stating that she lied to protect her and that the truth can help them mend their relationship.

10 years later, Wildcat is mentioned to still be in the JSA.

Beth Chapel / Doctor Mid-Nite II

Beth Chapel (portrayed by Anjelika Washington) is a social reject and nerd who becomes one of Courtney's friends and a member of the new JSA as the new Doctor Mid-Nite.

Beth was born on May 15, 2004, in Omaha General Hospital to Bridget and James Chapel. She primarily grew up in Blue Valley, Nebraska, with her loving and attentive parents. They were her best friends and very close throughout Beth's childhood. They had ant farms, roach farms, and did almost everything together. Beth grew up and eventually attended Blue Valley High, which is when her parents expressed a desire to get back to their lives. This proved difficult for Beth, so she threw herself into schoolwork and created the BVHS teachers appreciation club – though she is the only member. She quickly became an outcast despite her talkative and outgoing personality, but often participated in school events despite being relatively friendless.

In the first season, in the crowded cafeteria, Beth is eating lunch at her usual spot with Yolanda Montez and Rick Tyler, when they are suddenly joined by new-girl Courtney Whitmore. Courtney introduces herself and Beth warmly responds. When Courtney tries to converse with the group Beth stays silent along with everyone else. Beth tells her that the people at the table aren't friends with each other or anyone else and they're basically the Loser Table. She hardly reacts to Rick abruptly leaving or Henry King's aggressive behavior with Yolanda and the incident that followed. The next day, Beth video conferences with her mom at lunch and cues in her father. She excitedly gets her dad to join the "family lunch", only to be informed by him that he's busy. Bridget's colleague, Dr. Henry King Sr., stops by and waves hi to Beth, taking a seat at his desk behind Dr. Chapel. She asks her daughter who the girl sitting next to her, and Beth introduces Courtney to her. Beth tells Bridget she'll see Courtney at the open house, and their video call ends. Beth tells Courtney her parents were the best and Courtney gives her an awkward smile. At the open house that night, Beth excitedly tells her parents about her teachers and is seen socializing alongside her parents.

She later obtains the Charles McNider's goggles, befriends its A.I. which she nicknames "Chuck", becomes the new Doctor Mid-Nite, and joins Stargirl's Justice Society of America.

In season two, Chapel finds out that her parents are getting a divorce as she tries to reactivate "Chuck", only to come in contact with McNider, who is trapped in the Shadowlands. After falling victim to Eclipso's illusions, McNider advises her to keep the googles as they can see through Eclipo's tricks. Once McNider is freed, he helps Beth find Eclipso while breaking her parents out of the villain's illusions. Following Eclipso's defeat, Chapel's parents and McNider support her in being the new Doctor Mid-Nite before Chapel helps McNider discover what happened to his family.

In season three, Chapel is offered a new costume design by her parents. She ends up in a murder mystery when Gambler is found dead outside his trailer. Her goggles found no evidence that Shiv was responsible for the stab wounds. When a skin sample was found near the scene, Chapel and McNider later discover that the skin sample is the same as Dragon King's skin. After learning about what happened to Sylvester's sister Merry, Chapel tells her parents to avoid getting involved with Doctor Mid-Nite as she doesn't want them to end up like Merry. After downloading the files from Gambler's laptop, Beth worked to download them and was among those who found out that Courtney is seeing Cameron. Beth later visited Courtney and Pat to inform them that someone has been surveilling everyone. Beth caused a blackout around Blue Valley so that the hidden cameras can be found and removed. She does get concerned when Rick starts to get aggressive. When a signal was detected at the Mahkent family's house, Beth left the fighting to Yolanda and Rick. While having to avoid Sofus' attacks, Beth is contacted by her parents where they inform her the suit's battle mode that Charles McNider just informed them. Beth engages each of its fighting moves even when aided by Artemis. When Sofus has a heart attack after mentioning to Cameron that his father's evil did him in, Beth is walked through the defibrilator in her gloves which she uses on Sofus. Beth later tells Rick to take the hourglass off to no avail after he was examined by Bridget. She was later present when Pat and Sylvester told everyone about Ultra-Humanite. During the JSA's fight against Icicle's family, Beth and Sofus were unable to fight each other. After the fight, Beth and her parents were apologized to by Rick. Beth finally accepts help from her parents when she mentioned that she was tricked into turning them down.

10 years later, Beth is still a member of the JSA. Shade even mentions about her upcoming marriage to Rick.

Rick Tyler / Hourman II

Richard "Rick" Tyler (portrayed by Cameron Gellman and Boston Pierce portrays a 7-year-old Rick) is a high school delinquent with anger issues and the son of the original Hourman whose parents were killed in a staged car accident when he was seven. He becomes one of Courtney's friends and a member of the new JSA as the new Hourman.

Nine years ago, Rex Tyler and his wife, Wendi, lived in West Farms, Blue Valley, Nebraska, with their son, Rick. Rex had been tracking the ISA for a long time and had been onto something. One night, in a frenzy, Rex recorded down a burst of discovered information. He and Wendi quickly packed their bags into their car and planned to flee Blue Valley, much to the confusion of Rick. Wendi's brother, Matt Harris, arrived confused as to why he had been called to Blue Valley. Rex quickly explained that inside was the deed to the house, which they left to Matt, and records pertaining to Rick. On the certificates, Matt was listed as Rick's biological father and having the last name Harris instead of Tyler. Though Matt was hesitant, Rex told him about the $50,000 he left in the house for the pair. While they hoped to not be gone long, he wanted to have a backup plan just in case. Rex and Wendi tearfully said goodbye to their son. Rex gave Rick a 1966 yellow mustang keychain and told him to hold onto it while he was away. He alluded that it was more important than Rick knew. Rick's parents then got into their car and sped away while Rick yelled after them, begging his parents not to leave him. Rex and Wendi died in a car "accident" that night, and Rick fell into the custody of Matt.

Rick became a troubled kid at Blue Valley who was in and out of trouble be it at school or around town. His relationship with Matt was tumultuous and abusive, due to Matt's quick temper and bitterness over being left in charge of a kid he never wanted. Rick felt this neglect and, upon entering high school, became a delinquent. He often sat at a loser table where he kept to himself, stole school property, and frequently received detention. He also drank alcohol when he wasn't attending classes. In his free time, Rick worked to repair his father's mustang.

Rick learns Solomon Grundy killed his parents and his father was the hero Hourman. Seeking vengeance for his parents, Rick takes up his father's mantle and amulet and joins Stargirl's Justice Society. In addition, Pat Dugan gives him Rex's journal to decipher so they can foil the Injustice Society's plans. Rick finally confronts and defeats Grundy, but spares the zombie's life and lets him go.

In season two, Rick discovers Grundy lurking in the nearby forest and breaking into restaurants for food. Sympathizing with him, Rick leaves food for the zombie. However, Eclipso causes Rick to hallucinate Grundy killing a little girl before manipulating the former into attacking Matt and breaking the hourglass amulet, leading to Rick being arrested. While in prison, he attempts to use his father's journal to rebuild the amulet. He's later released from prison after Pat tortures Matt into dropping the charges and helps the JSA in the final battle against Eclipso. As Rick had a hard time repairing the hourglass amulet, he brought Solomon Grundy to help fight Eclipso who blasts a hole in him. Following Eclipso's defeat, Rick buries Solomon Grundy near an apple tree he planted as Shade states to him that Solomon Grundy has a habit of returning from the dead at the right place at the right time.

In season three, Rick is trying to figure out Shade's cryptic message as he kept burying and unburying Solomon Grundy's body in different locations in Blue Valley. He is still working on getting his hourglass back to working at 100% since it would only allow him to access his powers for less than an hour. Rick later mentions to Beth that Matt has left Blue Valley for unknown reasons. Sylvester advised Rick to look at the limiter in the hourglass and advises him not to go past an hour as Rex had a limiter in that hourglass for a reason. Rick then removes the limiter to see what Sylvester meant. Testing himself in Ripped City, Rick finds that he has maintained his super-strength for more than an hour. He even had the super-strength when he helped Yolanda fight Cindy. Rick and Yolanda later lash out at Courtney when Cindy revealed that Courtney was seeing Cameron. When Beth causes a blackout in Blue Valley so that everyone can find the hidden cameras, Rick was starting to act tougher which causes Beth to be concerned. Before taking out the last camera when the blackout ends, Rick states to whoever is using them that they will find them. When a signal was found at the Mahkent family's house, Rick went on the offensive with Cameron before being subdued by him. After Bridget Chapel examined Rick, Beth tries to get Rick to take the hourglass off to no avail. He finally sees the folly of this side effect which he admits to his friends. During the fight against Icicle's family, Rick struggles to fight Cameron. Afterwards, Rick apologizes to Beth and her parents.

10 years later, Rick is still a member of the JSA. Shade even mentions about his upcoming marriage to Beth.

Mike Dugan
Mike Dugan (portrayed by Trae Romano) is a Pat Dugan's son and Courtney's stepbrother.

Mike lived with his single father, Pat Dugan, in California with their dog. They moved around a lot when Mike was younger, but seemingly settled in California after Pat met Barbara Whitmore. When Pat and Barbara married, Mike gained a stepmother and new stepsister, Courtney. The blended family moved from California to Blue Valley, Nebraska. While he wasn't thrilled about the idea of moving to a nowhere town, he quickly adjusted to the small-town lifestyle but throwing himself into gaming.

In the first season, Pat Dugan arrives at the former house of the Whitmore's, his son Mike in the passenger seat and their dog Max in the backseat. Mike voices his disapproval about moving to a rural location that doesn't have several popular California food locations. Pat begs his son to stay positive, only to get a snarky reply that he's positive it'll blow ass. Mike tells his father he thought they were gonna stop moving around when he hooked up with Barbara, a term Pat rejects. Mike tries to pitch other ways of saying hooked up, but Pat ignores his son's snarkiness.

In season two, Cindy uses Mike as bait for the JSA to encounter the Injustice Unlimited. After a brief ownership of Thunderbolt's pen, he later finds that his friend Jakeem owns it.

In season three, Mike and Jakeem do their investigation on who killed Gambler. When Jakeem reads out a draft from Mike on the wish that would help them, Thunderbolt spells out the message on the bathroom wall at Blue Valley High School's bathroom wall that "the killer has many names". At one point, Mike and Jakeem tried to use Thunderbolt's wish to make Brian and Travis act nice towards them when threatening them for their money only for it not to work and Cindy arrived to fight them off. Mike and Jakeem try to get Cindy to join up with them upon noting that her connection with the JSA is rocky as Mike comes up with the Young All-Stars name. She turns them down. They try another attempt with Cindy to no avail where advice from Zeek was no help at all. Mike and Jakeem went to an old farm that was one of Dragon King's old lairs. They fled when they found a white gorilla approaching them. Mike and Jakeem managed to run into Cindy who directs them to the road back into town while she works on trapping the gorilla. Making their way back to Pat and Sylvester, Mike and Jakeem inform them about the white gorilla which led to the JSA learning that Ultra-Humanite is in Blue Valley. After hearing about Icicle's survival, Mike was present when Jakeem tried to make a wish that Icicle didn't have his powers only for Thunderbolt to state that he can't grant it since Icicle's powers are keeping him alive. Both of them receive a surprise visit from Cindy who agrees to let them help. They discover that Dragon King placed his brain into Ultra-Humanite's body while Ultra-Humanite's brain is in Sylvester's body. Mike witnesses Jakeem make a specific wish for Thunderbolt to save Cindy from her father which resulted in Thunderbolt turning Dragon King into a white gorilla plush toy.

10 years later, Shade mentioned that Mike joined the JSA operating S.T.R.I.P.E. 2.0.

Henry King Jr.

Henry King Jr. (portrayed by Jake Austin Walker) is a student at Blue Valley High as well as its star football player.

Henry King Jr. was born to Dr. Henry King Sr. and Merry King in 2004. He is the nephew of Merri's brother Sylvester Pemberton. Henry grew up in California with his parents. The day after his sixth birthday, Merri was supposed to pick Henry up from school but never showed. Henry was scared that his mother had forgotten about him. A few hours later, his father picked him up and told him that there had been an accident. His mother had fallen into the pool and drowned, and by the time Dr. King found her, she was ice cold. The remaining King's moved to Blue Valley, Nebraska, soon after Merri's death.

Three months ago, Henry had a relationship with Yolanda Montez and she believed they were serious. He was supportive of her campaign for student president and they enjoyed their time together. One night, he asked her to send him revealing pictures of herself and she obliged. The next day, he showed his friends the images in the halls of BVHS. His phone was taken by Cindy Burman, however, he managed to retrieve it. At the assembly, Yolanda's pictures were leaked by Cindy which led to a breakup between Henry and Yolanda. He then began dating Cindy, which was orchestrated by Dr. King and Cindy's father, Dr. Ito.

In the first season, Henry approaches a table in the cafeteria alongside his other jock friends. He leans to the right of Yolanda, smirking at her despite her being uncomfortable with his presence. His friends shroud to the left of her, boxing her in. Henry slyly and cruelly asks if his friends smell that, saying that it smells like a slut and looks at Yolanda. He then asks if she has taken any pictures she wants to share with them, but Yolanda stays quiet. Courtney Whitmore, however, speaks up telling him to leave Yolanda alone. Henry looks to Courtney and greets her as the new girl and snatches her phone, asking what she has on hers instead. He smirks holding it just out of her reach when she tries to grab it. As if on instinct, she shoves him backward while grabbing her phone back from him. He staggers into a lunch monitor who spills food all over the place. Henry mutters something after Courtney as she is taken away by Principal Bowin. That night, Henry and his friends gather at the drive-in movie theater but cause trouble instead. They are purposely loud and obnoxious, annoying fellow movie-goers who yell at them to stop. He and his friends advance to the car with the teens who dared to speak up against him. As they are harassing their peers, one of Henry's friends brings attention to the person letting air out of his tires. The staff Stargirl is holding intentionally hurtles itself into his chest, knocking him down. Henry and his other friend rush to fight Stargirl, unaware of the person's identity. The staff positions itself horizontally and glows bright, blinding Henry's friends and causing them to run into it. Henry recovers from being hit, and charges at Stargirl again. The staff twirls Stargirl into the air, tripping Henry back. The staff backs up to avoid one of the jocks and accidentally hits Henry in the face. Aiming for the third boy, the staff blasts a beam of light that causes Henry's car to explode, knocking everyone to the ground. Henry stands amidst the chaos and clutches his head, muttering that his dad is going to kill him.

After his dad Henry Sr. was hospitalized, Henry Jr. begins to visit him while he recuperates, during which Henry Jr.'s powers begin to develop before fully manifesting after Cindy challenges Stargirl. After researching his powers and his father's work, Henry Jr. slowly begins to share his father's views on humanity. Shortly after Stargirl tries to convince him otherwise in her civilian identity, Henry Jr. commits his first murder when he kills his father's lawyer for trying to have him taken off life support. After discovering Henry Sr. killed his mother to ensure his loyalty to the Injustice Society, Henry Jr. chooses to fight him and gives his life to save Stargirl's Justice Society while encouraging her to keep fighting and making peace with Yolanda as Brainwave collapses the ceiling on him.

Cindy Burman / Shiv

Cynthia "Cindy" Burman (portrayed by Meg DeLacy) is the daughter of the Dragon King, girlfriend of Henry King Jr. and the most popular student at Blue Valley High with enhanced abilities and wields wrist blades from her skin. While she is the school's cheerleading captain, she is determined to follow in her father's footsteps. In pursuit of this, she acquired a powerful suit of armor and a flame-throwing staff.

Cindy was born to Dr. Shiro Ito and his first wife, Suzanne Ito in Blue Valley, Nebraska. Shiro sought to conduct experiments on Cindy that would change her physically and emotionally. To avoid further trauma, Suzanne took Cindy and fled Blue Valley. They eventually settled in Farmersville, California. A fearful Cindy worried that her father would find her, though Suzanne assured her they were safe. That very night, Dragon King returned and took Cindy and Suzanne back to Blue Valley where he began his experiments. He started by placing shiv's in her wrists that allowed her to do irreparable harm to those around her. She grew up studying chemistry and became very advanced physically, mentally, and in her education.

When she was in the third grade, Cindy lost control of her powers and accidentally murdered Suzanne. She was devastated by the loss which Dragon King also blamed her for. On her first day in the fourth grade, Cindy addressed her class over the death of her mother and merely stated that she didn't like her mother anyway. After this, her father sought a new caretaker for Cindy but the first woman didn't work out for unknown reasons. He then kidnapped Bobbie Burman and made her into Cindy's caretaker and public stepmother. Following the death of her mother, Cindy's personality began to change into a more vicious and cunning young girl. She became the meanest girl in school during the fourth grade, and continued her tyrannical rule well into her years at Blue Valley High School.

By 2018, Cindy was the head cheerleader, best friends with the popular girls, and seemed to have it all. She opposed Yolanda Montez for school president but was jealous of Yolanda's relationship with Henry King Jr. She was also tasked by her father to get close with Henry to see if he exhibited any telekinetic powers like his father. One day, she witnessed Henry showing his friends topless photos that Yolanda had sent him the night before. She snatched the phone from his hands and saw the images, though Henry quickly took the phone back. At the election, Cindy sent the images out to the entire student body and faculty. She humiliated Yolanda and forced a breakup between her and Henry. Cindy then promptly began dating Henry.

When Courtney moved to Blue Valley High School and got in trouble with Principal Bowin for shoving Henry King Jr. into a passing lunch lady, Cindy quoted to Courtney "That's my boyfriend you bitch" as Principal Bowin scolds Cindy for using a bad language in her school. Dragon King even turned down having Cindy partaking in the ISA's activities. This causes Cindy to steal some of her father's inventions to force him to accept her by fighting and badly injuring Stargirl before being driven off by the school janitor Justin. During a rematch with Stargirl, Henry Jr. gets caught in the crossfire and uses his burgeoning psychic powers to knock them both down before Ito has his daughter evacuated by his drones. Dragon King imprisons Cindy to keep her out of further trouble. During the final battle against the ISA, Cindy escapes, kills her father, and finds a gem containing Eclipso amongst the Wizard's possessions.

In season two, Cindy works with Eclipso to create their own Injustice Society called Injustice Unlimited. While fighting Stargirl's Justice Society of America and Shade, Stargirl accidentally breaks the gem, freeing Eclipso. He uses a shard of it to send Cindy to the Shadowlands despite Stargirl's best efforts to save her, though Shade eventually uses his powers to rescue her. Following this, Cindy forms a truce with Courtney, admits to Yolanda that she was the one who leaked the photo, and calls Artemis Crock and her family to help defeat Eclipso. Following the fight, Cindy confronts Yolanda wanting to make amends and mentions her interest to join the JSA.

In season three, Cindy works on a positive approach on her life as she helps an old lady with her groceries and has re-enrolled in Blue Valley High School. When the JSA find Shiv near a dead Gambler, Shiv states that she wasn't the one who killed him. While in the ISA's headquarters, Cindy drank something that was in her father's book and works to get into Gambler's laptop. She found the blackmail information on the Crocks, but has a hard time getting into Dragon King's files. Cindy informs Sylvester of this as he declines her assistance. After the incident where S.T.R.I.P.E. had to break up a fight between Sylvester and the Crocks at a grocery store, Courtney warns Shiv that she will be off the team if she does anything like that again. It is revealed that Cindy is starting to transform into a reptilian form due to the effect of her father's experiments on her throughout her childhood as she starts to notice scales forming on her arms. Cindy successfully uses one of Gambler's devices to get into his laptop and find the location of one of her father's secret labs. After denying Mike and Jakeem's latest offer, Cindy later caught Wildcat sneaking into her house to put Gambler's laptop back which led to a cat fight that Hourman joined in. When Stargirl broke up the fight and the scales on Cindy's arm are shown, Cindy still denies not killing Gambler and states that she was trying to use the information to find her father's lab to find a cure for the advancing reptilian condition that started after she was rescued from the Shadowlands. In addition, Cindy revealed to Wildcat and Hourman that Courtney was seeing Cameron. Mike and Jakeem later run into Cindy after fleeing from a white gorilla. She assumes that the white gorilla was one of her father's creations as she directs them to a road that will lead them back into Blue Valley. Cindy later visited Mike and Jakeem at Jakeem's house where she finally allows them to let them help. Though she disagrees with the Young All-Stars name. When they find one of Dragon King's labs, they find Dragon King's body and that he transplated his brain into Ultra-Humanite's body while also placing Ultra-Humanite's brain into Sylvester Pemberton's body. Shiv struggles against her father until Thunderbolt grant's Jakeem's wish and turns Dragon King into a white gorilla plush toy.

10 years later, Cindy is mentioned by Shade to be part of the JSA under the title of Dragon Queen.

Jordan Mahkent / Icicle

Jordan Mahkent (portrayed by Neil Jackson) is the leader of the Injustice Society of America (ISA), an "astute" businessman with the power of cryokinesis and founder of a firm called The American Dream that is responsible for the revitalization of Blue Valley.

Jordan was in London when he first met Christine, a talented artist, who caught his attention because of her beauty. He was nervous to ask her out as another man was pursuing her, whom he implied to have killed to be her only suitor. When Jordan finally grew the courage to speak with Christine, she showed him the most beautiful drawings – of him. She had liked him too but was just waiting for him to make a move. They later married and had a son together, Cameron. At some point, Jordan founded The American Dream to rebuild America one town at a time.

During an unknown time, Jordan founded the Injustice Society of America and collected various individuals with an array of talents or gifts like Brainwave, Fiddler, Gambler, Shade, Solomon Grundy, Sportsmaster, Tigress, and Wizard. His collection of supervillains was doubted by reluctant allies, and he was ultimately betrayed by one of his members. Jordan, under his moniker of Icicle, made fast enemies with the Justice Society of America, a team of superheroes who sought to protect the world. As Icicle, he fought individual members of their team several times over the years before the culmination of their feud on December 24, 2010. The battle resulted in the destruction of the JSA where he somehow took down Flash, froze Sandman, and sent an icicle into Sylvester Pemberton.

Christine worked as a school teacher at a newly built school. Unbeknownst to anyone beforehand, Bannerman Chemicals built the school Christine worked at on top of a former chemical waste dump. The chemicals Christine was exposed to everyday caused her to develop cancer. It was in Blue Valley, Nebraska, that Christine laid in Jordan's bed at home, dying. Jordan brought their eight-year-old song Cameron to see his mother, so could have a chance to say goodbye. She died that night only moments after she made Jordan promise to do whatever it took to complete his mission – even if he had to kill anyone who got in his way. After Christine's death, Jordan was overcome with emotion and ran outside where he let out an emotional scream. He temporarily lost control of his powers and froze the entire garden while his son watched from inside the house.

Jordan left Blue Valley and temporarily resigned his leadership of the ISA to William Zarick. His son, Cameron, was primarily raised by Jordan's elderly parents Sofus and Lily. Jordan traveled around the country searching for the people responsible for his wife becoming ill. He also observed the state of the country and took notes on how broken the country is and the forgotten small towns.

After returning to Blue Valley, Icicle engages Stargirl and S.T.R.I.P.E. in battle, which leads to the murder of ISA member Wizard's son Joey. When Wizard confronts him about what happened, Icicle freezes him with his parents covering up his death by stating that he had a heart attack. When meeting with Dragon King, Icicle allowed him to have Wizard's body for one of his experiments. Icicle then meets with the ISA to determine how to handle Stargirl after she starts rebuilding the JSA. During the final battle, Icicle leads the ISA in enacting "Project: New America", but Stargirl's JSA foil their plans. After sustaining damage while fighting her and S.T.R.I.P.E., Icicle is shattered by Mike Dugan using his dad's truck.

In season three, Icicle revived himself in a liquid form before eventually reconstituting himself and is revealed to be the one who was spying on everyone. After forming an alliance with the Ultra-Humanite and Dragon King, reviving Sylvester for his own uses, and killing Sportsmaster and Tigress, he reunites with his family and claims to Stargirl that he has reformed while his accomplices cripple her JSA. In the forest, Icicle visited Dragon King in Ultra-Humanite's albino gorilla body and tells him "it's time". While fighting the heroes, Lily is killed by a falling car while Icicle is shattered once more by Cameron. Three months later, Icicle reconstituted himself once more and was laying low in Copenhagen. Upon trapping Icicle in pretroleum jelly laced with rubidium, potassium, and azidoazide azide, Artemis Crock burns Icicle alive with the flamible stuff in her father's bombs. The fire also caused his water form to evaporate, thus preventing him from reconstituting himself once more.

Henry King Sr. / Brainwave

Henry King Sr. (portrayed by Christopher James Baker) is a member of the ISA with psionic abilities, the father of Henry King Jr. and a successful neurosurgeon at Blue Valley Medical Center.

Henry was born on October 12, 1971, to an abusive and neglectful father, who believed lessons had to be taught physically and with emotional impact. When Henry was just a boy, he shoplifted a ball that he wanted but his father made him take it back. In protest, Henry threw the ball into a well. His father hung him upside down by the ankles over the well, threatening that if Henry ever disobeyed again, he would be dropped into the dark well. That moment of trauma shaped Henry's life, as he felt defenseless and weak ever since.

Decades ago, Henry King was a mere laboratory scientist who struggled to be taken seriously by his peers. He created cerebral expansion experiments that would, hopefully, grant people more access to the cerebral cortex of their brains. His superiors closed down his experiment and deemed it too dangerous. Henry decided to proceed against their orders and secretly use the experiments on himself. He began to manifest migraines and, during a mugging, read a man's mind for the first time. He also used telekinesis to save himself and gave the man a seizure just by thinking of it. From that point on, Henry documented every day of his journey with his powers by recording himself on a series of VHS tapes. The tapes would later be stored in his secret Brainwave room in his residence. When his powers manifested, Henry learned what he believed to be the real version of humanity. He heard wicked thoughts that made him grow to despise humans. He killed to make his mind feel better, as that was the only relief he could get from his headaches. After these events, Henry assumed the alias of the "terrible telepath" Brainwave, a powerful villain. He also joined the Injustice Society of America where he began working with Icicle to achieve Project: New America. His telepathic abilities would allow the ISA to take control of every developed mind in six states to carve out the "perfect" America. Around this time, he robbed a bank where he was apprehended by Merri, the "Girl of A Thousand Gimmicks", whose pure thoughts gave him pause. He was captivated by her.

They eventually married and had a son who they named Henry King Jr. after Dr. King. They settled in California where the ISA encountered their costumed counterparts, the Justice Society of America. Merri's brother operated as Starman, a member of the JSA. This caused conflict and paired with Merri's positive influence, Henry began to question Jordan's plan. On Christmas Eve, 2010, Jordan lured the JSA to California where Henry fought alongside his fellow ISA members as Brainwave. During the battle, Brainwave had killed Hawkman, Hawkgirl, and Johnny Thunder offscreen. Brainwave then faced off against Starman and the two had a war of mind and will. Brainwave was ultimately knocked down by Starman, who was later impaled by Icicle.

After the battle, Henry returned home and was forced to tell Merri about her brother's death and the role he played in it. He wanted her to go into hiding and run, but she refused and he knew she would never forgive him for the role he played in Sylvester's murder. Henry was forced to choose between the ISA and Merri, so he drowned Merri in their pool. He then picked Junior up from school and told him that Merri had died in an accident, that there was nothing he could do to save her. Henry promptly moved to Blue Valley, Nebraska, seemingly to help further Project: New America due to the town's ideal tunnel system.

Henry assumed a position at Blue Valley Medical Center where he is an extremely talented neuro-surgeon. At some point after, Henry collaborated with Dr. Shiro Ito/Dragon King to have the latter's daughter Cindy Burman date his son Henry King Jr. in order to monitor his behavior and see if his powers manifest.

After discovering that Stargirl had come into possession of Starman's Cosmic Staff and learning her secret identity in the present, Henry Sr. attempts to kill her and take the staff from her, but she defeats him and puts him into a coma. As part of the ISA's plans for Project: New America, Icicle makes preparations to revive Henry Sr. After the latter's son Henry Jr. murders his attorney, Henry Sr. wakes up from his coma and rejoins the ISA after Dragon King cures his amnesia. During a fight with the ISA, Henry had no choice but to kill his own son by collapsing the ceiling on him. When Stargirl leads a new iteration of the JSA against the ISA, Henry Sr. attempts to manipulate Wildcat by using her memories of his son against her, but she sees through his tactics and kills him.

Barbara Whitmore
Barbara Whitmore (portrayed by Amy Smart) is Courtney's mother and Pat Dugan's wife who strives to balance her work and home life. After her marriage to Pat, she initially serves as a surrogate mother to her stepson Mike and also to Courtney's JSA teammates after discovering Pat and Courtney's secrets.

Barbara was born and raised in Blue Valley, Nebraska. She moved to California during her adulthood, which is around the time she met Sam Kurtis. They had a daughter together, Courtney, which is when Barbara settled into Valley Village, California. Sam was never present in Courtney or Barbara's life, leaving her to primarily be a single mother.

On Christmas Eve 2010, Barbara Whitmore waited impatiently at her house with her daughter, Courtney, waiting for Courtney's father to arrive. When he failed to show and Barbara had to work, she asked her longtime friend Maggie Kramer if Courtney could stay at her house for the evening. Maggie agreed happily and told Barbara that they are friends and she's happy to help. Barbara kissed her daughter goodbye saying that Maggie will watch her while Barbara's at work. Courtney understands but cries that she wants her father, which Barbara knows. She leaves for work while Courtney looks out the window waiting for a man that would never show.

In 2018, Barbara met Pat Dugan at Richie's Diner while visiting Blue Valley to settle her deceased mother's estate. They ordered the same food – a corn dog and banana split. They had an instant connection and were married two years later. After accepting a job in Blue Valley, Barbara, her husband, daughter, and stepson moved from California to Blue Valley. She gets a job at the American Dream.

In season two, Barbara is still working at the American Dream.

In season three, Barbara is approached by Paula Crock at the American Dream when she wants her to hook Artemis up with the JSA. After Gambler was found dead, Barbara was visited by Paula again stating that Artemis made an impression on the No Limits Gang, the Crocks had no involvement in Gambler's death, and she is trying to make a cake. Both Barbara and Paula work on perfecting a cake. Barbara's proposal plans for her manager Tim T. Tattle fall through causing her to work on a better proposal plan. Thanks to Paula, Tim accepts Barbara's latest proposal plan. Paula congratulates her by giving her a taxidermy raccoon as a gift. Barbara and Pat were later suspicious on the motives of Sofus and Lily Mahkent. Paula tries to teach Barbara some self-defense just in case the culprit comes for her. After Lily showed up at Barbara's house, Barbara was taught how to use the crossbow by Paula. She was also present when Pat and Sylvester told everyone about Ultra-Humanite. Barbara would later be devastated when she hears about what happened to Sportsmaster and Tigress and be surprised when Icicle turns up alive. She later invited a grieving Artemis to her house. During the fight against Artemis' body, Barbara uses a crossbow on Icicle.

Pat Dugan / S.T.R.I.P.E.

Patrick "Pat" Dugan (portrayed by Luke Wilson) is a Courtney's stepfather, the former sidekick to Starman, and a mechanic who owns a repair garage where he stores a 15-foot robotic vehicle of his own creation made from spare car parts. Pat serves as a reluctant mentor and father figure to Courtney and her JSA teammates while using a garage called The Pit Stop as a front. Despite his superheroics, Pat wants to provide a normal life for his family.

Pat's father was a mechanic in the army who worked on tanks. His work required the Dugan's to move around a lot, especially when he was a teenager. Every year or two they had to pack up and move to a new place. The constant moving never allowed Pat to form lasting friendships, so he grew close to his father and regarded him as his best friend. At some point Pat followed in his father's footsteps and joined the army.

When Pat was twenty he was hired by the Pemberton family to serve as their mechanic and driver. He befriended the Pemberton's fifteen-year-old son, Sylvester. One day, Sylvester put on a mask to stop criminals that were threatening his parents, and Pat helped him in his endeavor. Their partnership eventually turned to friendship with Sylvester and Pat extending their crime-fighting antics to superheroism. Sylvester went as the masked hero, Star-Spangled Kid. Pat served as Sylvester's sidekick and guardian, Stripesy. His less-than-inspired superhero name of Stripesy was due to his striped outfit and highlighted Sylvester's alias as the Star-Spangled Kid. He served as the sidekick to Sylvester's teenage alias, Star-Spangled-Kid. The duo's antics caught the attention of the media, specifically Civic City News when they defeated a villain named Doctor Weerd.

At the beginning of their crime-fighting days, Pat and Sylvester joined the underappreciated group known as the Seven Soldiers of Victory. They followed the leadership of Shining Knight with Pat growing close to the Shining Knight. The group later encountered the reptilian villain known as Dragon King. The Star-Spangled Kid and Stripesy helped the Seven Soldiers of Victory stop Dragon King from destroying New York. They even saved the world once. Once Dragon King went into hiding, the Soldiers disbanded and lost contact with one another.

A few years later, Sylvester found the cosmic staff and began using it in his times as a superhero. He reinvented himself as the adult superhero Starman, though Pat still operated as his sidekick Stripesy. Sylvester was recruited into the Justice Society of America, an elite team of superheroes that gained much media attention. Sylvester brought Pat into the JSA and the team became very close. Pat served as the team's sidekick and took care of their artifacts and kept their suits clean. He was a valued and important member of the JSA.

On Christmas Eve, 2010, the Injustice Society lured the JSA into a battle in an abandoned California mansion. Unbeknownst to them at the time, the battle was a trap as the ISA planned to eliminate the JSA so they could further a secret agenda. The JSA was defeated by the time Pat, who was absent from the battle for a majority of the time, arrived. He rushed to Starman's aid in the hopes of saving his friends. He witnessed the deaths of Wildcat, Dr. Mid-Nite, and many others. He attempted to escape with a fatally wounded Starman, who died later that night.

Pat kept Starman's staff safe and retired from his sidekick days. He ensured the rest of the JSA's artifacts and suits were safely stored in the JSA headquarters. Pat still wanted revenge on the ISA and offered to help his fellow JSA member, Rex Tyler, who had also survived the battle. Rex declined his help, even turning down Pat's new armored robot. Nine years ago, in 2011, Rex changed his mind and sent Pat all of his research including his journal.

Two years ago, Pat followed Rex's research to Blue Valley, Nebraska. During this visit to Blue Valley, Pat met Barbara Whitmore at Richie's Diner while they were both visiting Blue Valley. They ordered the same food – a corn dog and banana split. They had an instant connection and were married a few years later. After accepting a job in Blue Valley, Barbara, Pat, his son Mike, and stepdaughter Courtney, moved from California to Blue Valley.

In season two, Pat tries to get Courtney to focus on her school work. When she claims that there might be other JSA villains that might be associates of the ISA that are still at large, Pat mentions that Flash banished Per Degaton to another dimension, Green Lantern vanquished Blackbriar Thorn, and Baron Blitzkrieg died during the war. Courtney later learns about Pat's history with Eclipso. Following Eclipso's defeat, Pat is among those dismayed that the Crock family moved in next door.

In season three, Pat reconnects with Sylvester as he shows him the S.T.R.I.P.E. armor. Sportsmaster gets Pat back on their training regiment as he also advises him not to trust Gambler. When Sylvester fights the Crocks at a grocery store, Pat hears about this and uses the S.T.R.I.P.E. armor to break it up. Pat later told Sylvester that the Crocks didn't kill Gambler. He later works on a new costume for Sylvester. After Sylvester recuperated in the hospital, he and Pat watch The Outlaw Josey Wales where they are joined by Crusher. Pat later gives Sylvester a new Starman costume. Barbara and Pat were later suspicious on the motives of Sofus and Lily Mahkent. After overhearing Sylvester consoling Courtney when Yolanda and Rick lashed out at her for seeing Cameron, Pat was with Courtney when Beth reveals that someone is surveilling everyone. Pat ends up dragged with Courtney to the basement of the Helix Institute for Youth Rehabilitation by Shade in order to meet up with Jennie as her brother is upstairs. After Jennie's attempt to free Todd unleashed energies that knocked everyone back, Todd's shadow abilities send Pat and Shade into the Shadowlands. After a trip to the Shadowlands while experiencing visions of his dad, Barbara, and Mike, Pat persuades Shade to mentor Todd. Then he and Courtney take the bus back to Blue Valley while wondering who really was spying on them since Nurse Louise Love denied any knowledge of it. After a talk with Barbara, Pat is advised to find Mike's biological mother. After a visit to Sofus, Pat and Sylvester were reunited with Mike and Jakeem where they learned of their encounters with a white gorilla. This caused Pat and Sylvester to tell everyone about Ultra-Humanite. Pat would later find out what happened to Sportsmaster and Tigress and also tries to keep Sylvester from seeking vengeance against Icicle. When it was discovered that Sylvester's body housed Ultra-Humanite's brain, Pat was buried alive. He managed to get out by using the same trick that Sylvester taught him back when was captured by Dr. Weerd. Pat used S.T.R.I.P.E. to fight Ultra-Humanite until Courtney arrived and reclaimed the Cosmic Staff. Pat then used a rock to knock out Ultra-Humanite. Pat and Courtney were told by Charles that Ultra-Humanite is comatose and suggests that they keep him on life support until Sylvester's brain can be found.

10 years later, it was mentioned by Shade that Stargirl and S.T.R.I.P.E. were successful in finding Sylvester's brain and placed it back into his body enough to fully revive him.

Cameron Mahkent

Cameron "Cam" Mahkent (portrayed by Hunter Sansone and Roger Dale Floyd portrays a younger Cameron) is a student at Blue Valley High, aspiring artist, and the son of Jordan Mahkent who was born with cryokinetic powers like his father. He and Courtney share a mutual crush.

Cameron was born to Jordan and Christine Mahkent in Blue Valley, Nebraska. Eight years ago, Cameron's mother, Christine, was exposed to a toxin that ultimately gave her cancer. At this point, he was living with his father and Grandparents. One night, Cameron's father, Jordan, took Cameron to say goodbye to his dying mother. Cameron gave Christine a floral drawing of her garden, to which she told him to never stop drawing. They hugged but she went into a cardiac episode which scared Cameron, and he ran away. She died later that night and Cameron was primarily raised by his grandparents, while his father left to explore the country and hunt down the people responsible for Christine's death.

In season two, Cameron works on a mural of his father and is raised by his grandparents while denying Cindy's offer to find the people that killed his dad. What he doesn't know is that his own cryokinesis is developing. At one point, Eclipso used an illusion of a cryokinetic Cameron to torment Mike. Once his mural is done sometime after Eclipso's defeat, his grandparents reveal their cryokinesis to him.

In season three, the side effect of Cameron's emerging cryokinesis are affecting his art talent at school and at home as his grandparents give him a word of advice. They even have him give up art until further notice. Courtney later witnesses Cameron's cryokinesis and that he can do real help to people. Courtney starts working to find ways to help Cameron use his abilities for good. Yolanda and Rick find out about it from Cindy after their altercation which Stargirl broke up as Courtney claims that there might be some good in him. Courtney later visits Cameron. Before she can tell him the truth about his father, Rick shows up to attack him. Cameron subdues him before a wounded Sofus told Cameron that Jordan's evil did him in. When Cameron later asks Courtney who killed his father, Courtney covered up Mike's actions by stating that she did it which puts a strain on their relationship. Cameron was later with his grandparents when Icicle turned up alive and was told more about his family's life as well as learning that Mike was the one who ran Pat's truck into Icicle. He later had a talk with Courtney about his father and apparently showed no ill-will towards Mike during their discussion. During the fight against Icicle's family, Cameron fought Hourman before turning against his father. When Stargirl offers to help Cameron, he takes his leave to get his grandfather some medical attention. Cameron later returns to see if Courtney is right about wanting to help him.

10 years later, it was mentioned by Shade that Cameron is a member of the JSA where he became the new heroic version of Icicle.

Eclipso

Eclipso (portrayed by Nick Tarabay and Milo Stein portrays Eclipso's form of Bruce) is an entity trapped inside a black diamond that Cindy obtains. He plans to become a god by feeding on the negativity and darkness of the people on Earth.

Eclipso is an entity of vengeance and evil that was given life by and once resided in The Shadowlands, a place of darkness and shadows. The Black Diamond originated on Diablo Island, a now-forgotten island in the Pacific Ocean. Diablo Island was removed from maps by 1832, as those who visited never returned. According to legend, there were two waring tribes living on either side of the island. One tribe summoned an evil entity of vengeance to weaponize against their enemies. They sealed the entity inside the black diamond.

An explorer named Bruce Gordon rediscovered Diablo Island, but when he arrived everyone had been dead for decades. He found the Black Diamond and picked it up, which made him susceptible to the effects of Eclipso's powers. He returned to the mainland and used Eclipso's influence to achieve fame as one of the greatest explorers in the world. Bruce wrote many books about the island and reached notoriety for being the only person who ever returned.

Eventually, Bruce grew weary of the price his fame and riches cost, including Eclipso ruining his friends and colleagues. Gordon contemplated suicide, but Eclipso convinced him he could help reclaim his lost love Nora by killing her husband. Bruce would not take someone's life, however Eclipso offered to do it for him and Bruce Gordon's body was completely taken over by Eclipso.

At some point, Eclipso used the form of Bruce as a ten-year-old boy to tempt his latest victim, Rebecca McNider. She fell victim to Eclipso when she was lured across the street to a birthday party her mother forbid her from attending. Eclipso encouraged her to steal a doll from the pile of presents. When she did, Bruce appeared behind Rebecca and held up the black diamond. Rebecca was found dead by her mother soon after.

The Justice Society of America members Green Lantern, Spectre, Hawkman, and Hawkgirl all faced Eclipso and lost, with Eclipso then vowing to come after the JSA's families. After receiving information from the Shade that killing Eclipso's host would send him back into the diamond Starman, Wildcat and Hourman decided to kill Bruce Gordon. They went against the wishes of Stripsey and Flash who thought it was against the JSA's belief's to take a human life. Gordon was killed by the JSA with Eclipso being trapped back in the Black Diamond. Starman had the black diamond put it into storage. This choice of action affected the JSA which is the reason why they were later beaten by the ISA some years later.

At some point, William Zarick, also known by his villainous counterpart The Wizard, came into possession of the diamond containing Eclipso. He hid it in his storage unit in Blue Valley, Nebraska. Cindy later found the diamond following Icicle's defeat.

In season two, Cindy works with Eclipso to form their version of the Injustice Society called Injustice Unlimited. Though she was not pleased that Eclipso used her body to kill her stepmother. After recruiting Isaac Bowin and Artemis Crock, they battle Stargirl's JSA and Shade until Stargirl accidentally breaks the Black Diamond. Free of his imprisonment, Eclipso betrays Cindy, using a diamond shard to send her to the Shadowlands before consuming Bowin, injuring Hourman, and causing Shade and Crock to flee before doing the same. Utilizing Gordon's likeness, Eclipso soon resurfaces to torment the JSA and Stargirl's family via their negative emotions and memories like tormenting Yolanda with the images of Brainwave and Henry King Jr., have Beth experience her parents getting a divorce, making Rick think that Solomon Grundy kill a girl when he was actually making him attack his Uncle Matt, causing Barbara to experience the rebirth of Icicle in the snowstorm, causing Matt to be attacked by a cryokinetic Cameron, and causing Pat to see the illusions of Bruce Gordon and some of the ISA members. While Beth is able to resist, Eclipso sends Stargirl to the Shadowlands despite the resistance from Pat and Jennie. After Shade rescues Stargirl and Burman, the pair join forces with the JSA, Sportsmaster, Tigress, Starman, Solomon Grundy, and Thunderbolt to fight Eclipso. While Eclipso kills Grundy, Sportsmaster and Tigress weaken the former before Thunderbolt turns Eclipso into a slice of toast during Stargirl and Jennie's attack on him. The heroes hide Eclipso's toast form for safekeeping.

Lawrence "Crusher" Crock / Sportsmaster

Lawrence "Crusher" Crock / Sportsmaster (recurring season 1; guest season 2; main season 3; portrayed by Neil Hopkins) is a member of the ISA who wields sports-themed weapons and believes that all of his targets are just part of a game to win.

Sportsmaster partook in the ISA's attack on the Justice Society of America (JSA)'s headquarters where he and Tigress were knocked down by Starman.

10 years later, Crusher is the owner of a gym in Blue Valley called Ripped City, is married to Paula Brooks, and is the father of Artemis Crock. In "The Justice Society", Sportsmaster and Tigress were instructed by Icicle to dust off their outfits to help Gambler with his mission while also mentioning the complaint they got from Anaya Bowin about killing another coach. As they met Gambler while watching Artemis perform on the football field, they go over their plans for the mission and even take the moment to scold Gambler for littering near them upon his arrival. Sportsmaster and Tigress attack and overpower Stargirl and her friends when they attempt to intercept an ISA operation only to be driven off by S.T.R.I.P.E. Sportsmaster assists the ISA in enacting Project: New America. Both of them are defeated by Stargirl's JSA.

In season two, it is mentioned that Sportsmaster and Tigress are incarcerated. Sportsmaster and Tigress temporarily break out of prison to see their daughter Artemis' football tryouts. In the episode "Summer School: Chapter Thirteen", Artemis breaks Sportsmaster and Tigress out of prison so that they can help Cindy Burman and the JSA fight Eclipso. Following this, the Crock family move in next door to the Whitmore-Dugan family much to the dismay.

In season three, Sportsmaster reopens Ripped City, gets Pat back on their training regiment, and advises Pat not to trust Eclipso. While it was claimed that neither Sportsmaster or Tigress had any involvement in Gambler's death, both of them appear to be sharing a secret. This turned out to be that Gambler once blackmailed them. Sylvester confronted both Crocks while they were grocery shopping and fought them until S.T.R.I.P.E. arrived to break it up. Both Crocks did confirm that Gambler blackmailed them once and the payments in question were paid off. Crusher later comes in on Sylvester and Pat while they are watching The Outlaw Josey Wales. Crusher and Paula later visit Pat and Barbara at the diner where they mentioned that everyone that owed Gambler money has paid them back. Crusher later checked up on Pat when he was looking for Mike's biological mother. Crusher and Paula later visit Sofus and Lily where they advised them to forgive the JSA for what happened to Icicle. Later that night, both of them received a call from Artemis about her getting into Nebraska. Then they find posters for Ripped City leading to an open manhole. Crusher and Paula find a room full of monitors as they are frozen to death by a reconstituted Icicle. Before they are fully frozen, Crusher and Paula voice their love for each other. Then Icicle shatters their bodies. Artemis later found out what happened to her parents and Icicle would later claim to Courtney that they surprised him and he acted in self-defense. His death would later be avenged by Artemis when she kills Icicle in Copenhagen.

Paula Brooks / Tigress

Paula Brooks / Tigress (recurring season 1; guest season 2; main season 3; portrayed by Joy Osmanski) is a member of the ISA who hunts the world's most dangerous humans.

Tigress took part in the ISA's attack on the JSA's headquarters. She fought Hourman before he was ambushed by Wizard. Starman even fought her and Sportsmaster where he knocked them to the ground.

10 years later, Paula is a gym teacher at Blue Valley High, the wife of "Crusher" Crock, and mother of Artemis Crock. She is the one who directs Courtney to where Yolanda Montez, Beth Chapel, and Rick Tyler sit. In "The Justice Society", Sportsmaster and Tigress were instructed by Icicle to dust off their outfits to help Gambler with his mission while mentioning the complaint he got from Anaya Bowin about them killing another coach. As they met Gambler while watching Artemis perform on the football field, they go over their plans for the mission and even take the moment to scold Gambler for littering near them upon his arrival. Sportsmaster and Tigress attack and overpower Stargirl and her friends when they attempt to intercept an ISA operation only to be driven off by S.T.R.I.P.E. When Sportsmaster and Tigress were hunting the Whitmore-Dugans and received Anaya Bowin as their backup, Tigress was the one who killed Bowin after she insulted them for the fact that they can't keep Artemis in line. Sportsmaster assists the ISA in enacting Project: New America. Both of them are defeated by Stargirl's JSA.

In season two, it is mentioned that Sportsmaster and Tigress are incarcerated. Sportsmaster and Tigress temporarily break out of prison to see their daughter Artemis' football tryouts. In the episode "Summer School: Chapter Thirteen", Artemis breaks Sportsmaster and Tigress out of prison so that they can help Cindy Burman and the JSA fight Eclipso. Following this, the Crock family move in next door to the Whitmore-Dugan family much to their dismay.

In season three, Paula visits Barbara at the American Dream where she asks to have the JSA bring Artemis into their group. She later visited Barbara again where she mentions that her family had no involvement in Gambler's death, Artemis making a first impression by defeating the No Limits Gang, and that she has been working on perfecting a cake for the Women's Rotary Club. Barbara and Paula then work on perfecting one. Later that night at Ripped City, it is revealed that Paula and Crusher are hiding a secret. This turned out to be that Gambler once blackmailed them. While visiting Barbara, Paula witnesses Tim T. Tattle reject Barbara's proposal. Sylvester confronted both Crocks while they were grocery shopping and fought them until S.T.R.I.P.E. arrived to break it up. Both Crocks did confirm that Gambler blackmailed them once and the payments in question were paid off. Paula later sneaks into Tim's office and starts to intimidate him into treating Barbara better. This tactic worked as Tim approves Barbara's proposal. Paula later thanks Barbara by giving her a taxidermy raccoon as a gift. Paula and Crusher later visited Pat and Barbara at the diner where they mentioned that everyone that owed Gambler money has paid him back. Paula worked to teach Barbara some self-defense just in case the culprit comes for her. When Lily pays a visit to Barbara, Paula shows up an repels her. Then Paula teaches Barbara how to wield a crossbow. Paula and Crusher later visit Sofus and Lily where they advised them to forgive the JSA for what happened to Icicle. Later that night, both of them received a call from Artemis about her getting into Nebraska. Then they find posters for Ripped City leading to an open manhole. Paula and Crusher find a room full of monitors as they are frozen to death by a reconstituted Icicle. Before they are fully frozen, Paula and Crusher voice their love for each other. Then Icicle shatters their bodies. Artemis later found out what happened to her parents and Icicle would later claim to Courtney that they surprised him and he acted in self-defense. Her death would later be avenged by Artemis when she kills Icicle in Copenhagen.

Sylvester Pemberton / Starman
Sylvester Pemberton / Starman (guest season 1; recurring season 2; main season 3; portrayed by Joel McHale) is a member of the original JSA who used an anti-gravity Cosmic Staff invented by scientist Ted Knight that Courtney later finds. Pat Dugan served as his sidekick during their early days and Sylvester has a sister named Merry who was married to Brainwave.

During the threat of Eclipso, Sylvester and the JSA had a hard time deciding what to do with Eclipso who is using the body of Bruce Gordon. Hourman and Wildcat voted to kill Gordon while Flash and Pat voted against it. Starman had no choice but to kill him offscreen and contain Eclipso's gem. Both Starman and Pat had a drink afterwards.

During the holiday season when the Injustice Society had gotten back together, Starman and the Justice Society were attacked at their base by the Injustice Society as he advised an approaching Pat to stay away. Starman was able to knock down Wizard, Gambler, Sportsmaster, Tigress, and Brainwave. The ISA's leader Icicle fatally wounded Sylvester, but Pat evacuated him. In his dying moments, he urged Pat to find someone worthy to wield his Cosmic Staff and ensure the Justice Society's legacy survived. His staff was later found by Courtney Whitmore, who became the show's titular character and Pemberton's successor. In the two-part season one finale, "Stars and S.T.R.I.P.E.", a man claiming to be Pemberton searches for Pat in California.

This is confirmed in season two to be Sylvester Pemberton back from the dead as he continues to search for Pat. By the time he finds where Pat currently lives, he shows up to help Courtney get Eclipso out of her. Following Eclipso's defeat, Sylvester offers to teach Stargirl some moves while planning to explain to her and Pat about how he is back from the dead later.

In season three, Sylvester fixes the house up by the time the Whitmore-Dugan family returns from Yellowstone. All he can recall about coming back to life is waking up in a casket and digging himself out with no injuries from Icicle's attack. It is suspected that the Cosmic Staff had something to do with it. After seeing S.T.R.I.P.E in action, Sylvester and Courtney agree to a joint custody of the Cosmic Staff with Sylvester wielding it while Courtney is in school. He does take Courtney out of school to teach him some of his moves. When it came to finding out who killed Gambler, Sylvester got aggressive towards Shade twice when he thought Shade was lying during Pat's chat with him and when Shade made a comment that Sylvester's funeral was only attended by Pat in front of Courtney. When both Courtney and Sylvester were confronted by Pat and Barbara later that night, Sylvester wonders why he came back from the dead while the rest of the slain JSA haven't. Following a tip-off from Cindy, Sylvester fought both Crocks at a grocery store assuming that they killed Gambler. The fight was later broken up by S.T.R.I.P.E. Sylvester was later told that the Crocks were innocent. While investigating the scene of the crime, Sylvester was attacked by the culprit that was responsible for Gambler's death. In "Chapter Four: The Evidence", it was confirmed by Charles McNider that the Cosmic Staff has altered Sylvester's physiology, giving him the power to regenerate his skin much similar to that of Cindy Burman. Pat later gives Sylvester a new Starman costume. While investigating one of Dragon King's old secret labs, Sylvester informed Beth about what happened to Merry and told Rick about checking the limiter in his father's hourglass. After Yolanda and Rick lash out at Courtney for seeing Cameron, Sylvester consoled her which is overheard by Pat. After a visit to Sofus, Sylvester and Pat are reunited with Mike and Jakeem who inform them about a white gorilla they encountered. This caused Sylvester and Pat to tell everyone about Ultra-Humanite. After Sylvester hears about Icicle's survival, Pat had to work to keep Sylvester from seeking vengeance against him. Going against the objections of Pat and Courtney in killing Icicle, Sylvester advises Yolanda and Beth to start finding legacies of the JSA as he notes that while Sandman has a nephew, Atom has a son, and Alan Scott has his children, some of its members don't have children like himself, Mister Terrific, Doctor Fate, Spectre, and Flash. It would later be revealed that Sylvester's been dead and that his body is being used by Ultra-Humanite's brain while Dragon King's brain is in Ultra-Humanite's albino gorilla body. This was pulled off by using an unspecified chemical that revived Sylvester when his brain was replaced with Ultra-Humanite's brain. Dragon King kept Sylvester's brain in a mountain lair.

10 years later, Shade mentioned that Sylvester's brain was found and reunited with his body where he lead the JSA into rescuing the other Seven Soldiers of Victory from Nebula Man.

Jakeem Williams / Jakeem Thunder

Jakeem Williams / Jakeem Thunder (guest season 2; main season 3; portrayed by Alkoya Brunson) is a gamer who is Mike Dugan's best friend, the younger brother of Jenny Williams, and the current keeper of Thunderbolt's pen.

When Mike wishes for the pen to be in better hands, it ends up in the hands of Jakeem Williams. He does makes some wishes that resulted in larger foods appearing in Blue Valley. When Thunderbolt returns from China with Chinese food, he grants a wish for a replacement part for S.T.R.I.P.E. to appear. Thunderbolt assists in the attack on Eclipso where he manages to shock him before Eclipso threw him into S.T.R.I.P.E. After Eclipso was weakened, Thunderbolt granted Jakeem's wish for Eclipso to be toast as he turns Eclipso into toast during Courtney and Jennie's final attack on him.

In season three, Jakeem is on his paper route and delivers the paper to Shade as Thunderbolt states to him that Shade still creeps him out. When Mike and Jakeem do their part in investigating Gambler's death, Mike wrote out a draft for Jakeem to wish that they knew who killed Gambler. Jakeem reads the draft and Thunderbolt leaves a message on Blue Valley High School's bathroom wall stating that "the killer has many names". At one point, Mike and Jakeem tried to use Thunderbolt's wish to make Brian and Travis act nice towards them when threatening them for their money only for it not to work and Cindy arrived to fight them off. Mike and Jakeem try to get Cindy to join up with them upon noting that her connection with the JSA is rocky. She turns them down. Mike and Jakeem try another attempt which doesn't go well and the advice given to them by Zeek was no help to them. Following a wish to have the cameras that Gambler's murderer touched brought to him, Jakeem received some advice from Zeek about how a wish can be fully used. Thunderbolt supported that claim. Jakeem and Mike went to a farm that was one of Dragon King's old lairs. They end up running from a white gorilla. Jakeem and Mike run into Cindy who directs them to a road back to Blue Valley as Jakeem uses a wish from Thunderbolt to help them back into town. Reuniting with Pat and Sylvester, Jakeem and Mike inform them about the white gorilla causing Pat and Sylvester to tell everyone about Ultra-Humanite. When Jakeem wants Thunderbolt to make a wish for Icicle to not have his powers, Thunderbolt tells him that he can't grant that wish since Icicle's powers are keeping him alive and states that he can't grant wishes to kill anyone. Jakeem, Mike, and Shiv found that Dragon King placed his body into Ultra-Humanite's body. In order to save Shiv, Jakeem made a specific wish that enabled Thunderbolt to turn Dragon King into a white gorilla plush toy.

10 years later, Shade mentioned that Jakeem is a member of the JSA under the title of Jakeem Thunder.

Recurring characters

Introduced in season one

Ted Grant / Wildcat

Ted Grant / Wildcat is a member of the original JSA who was a former heavyweight boxer and skilled street fighter that wore an exosuit that artificially enhanced his natural athletic prowess.

During the fight against Eclipso, Wildcat attended Rebecca McNider's funeral. Then he and the other JSA members had to decide what to do about Eclipso and his host Bruce Gordon. Wildcat and Hourman voted to kill off Gordon while Flash and Pat voted not to kill Gordon. This resulted in them having no choice but to kill Bruce Gordon and contain his gem.

When the ISA got back together one holiday season, Wildcat showed up at Pat's garage to pick up Johnny Thunder as Solomon Grundy is with the ISA. He advised Pat to worry about the safety of his son. When Pat arrived at the scene of the fight, Grant was thrown out of a window by an unknown opponent and landed near him.

Ten years later, Grant's suit was inherited by Yolanda Montez who became the new Wildcat.

In season two, Eclipso used an illusion of Ted Grant to fight Yolanda.

Charles McNider / Doctor Mid-Nite

Charles McNider / Doctor Mid-Nite (portrayed by Henry Thomas in season one, Alex Collins in season two-three) is a member of the original JSA who was a detective and a brilliant and forward-thinking medical pioneer with special goggles equipped with an A.I., later named "Chuck" by Beth, patterned on his personality to aid him in fighting crime.

During the threat of Eclipso, Charles lost his daughter Rebecca to him. He and his wife Myra attended her funeral where some of the JSA members in their civilian attires also attended.

During the fight between the JSA and the ISA, Doctor Mid-Nite was grabbed by one of Shade's attacks.

In season two, Shade denied that he killed McNider. It turns out that he was secretly rescued by Shade during the ISA's attack and lost him in the Shadowlands. McNider eventually makes contact with Chapel and later encounters Courtney Whitmore and Cindy Burman after Eclipso sent them to the Shadowlands. Once Shade uses his abilities to free the trio, McNider and Chapel work to find Eclipso. After Whitmore's JSA defeat Eclipso, McNider gives Chapel his blessing to continue operating as Doctor Mid-Nite before she informs him that his wife has settled in Melody Hills, where she now has a son.

In season three, McNider returns to Blue Valley to help examine Sylvester Pemberton's wounds. He postulates that the Cosmic Staff has granted him a healing factor and even mentions that he and his family are doing well. McNider and Chapel analyze the skin sample found at the scene of Gambler's murder and find that it matches Dragon King's skin. McNider would later send Bridget and James the information needed for Beth to access her suit's combat abilities and the defibrilator in her gloves after Sofus had a heart attack. Following the defeat of Icicle and Ultra-Humanite, Charles scanned Sylvester's body and notes that Ultra-Humanite's brain is comatose. He suggests keeping Ultra-Humanite on life support until Sylvester's brain was found.

Chuck
"Chuck" (voiced by Henry Thomas in season one, Alex Collins in season two) is an A.I. of Charles McNider.

Jenny Williams
Jenny Williams (season 1; guest season 2; portrayed by Ashley Winfrey) is a student at Blue Valley High School, the best friend of Cindy Burman, co-captain of the school's cheerleading squad, and the older sister of Jakeem.

In season two, Jenny informs Jakeem to do the dishes. During one of those instances, Jenny is shown helping Jakeem and Mike with them.

Artemis Crock

Artemis Crock (portrayed by Stella Smith) is the daughter of "Crusher" Crock and Paula Brooks and a star athlete at Blue Valley High School.

In season two, Artemis is in a foster home following the arrest of her parents. Thanks to Eclipso, she joins Cindy's Injustice Unlimited.

In season three, Artemis moves next door to the Whitmore-Dugan's and wants to join the new JSA during Paula's discussion with Barbara. She tries to prove himself by taking out the No Limits Gang. Paula later informed Barbara of Artemis' impression in front of the JSA. Artemis later helps Beth fight Sofus. Artemis later calls her parents to inform them that she got into Nebraska. When her parents don't come home, Artemis informs the Whitmore-Dugan family. She, Courtney, Yolanda, and Beth find where Icicle was watching them and organic matter remains thawing out. Figuring out what happened, Artemis let out a saddened scream. While mourning her parents' death in her room, Artemis is approached by Barbara who invites her to come live with her family. Three months after the defeat of Icicle and Dragon King, Artemis found Icicle laying low in Copenhagen. Using a petroleum jelly trap, Artemis burns Icicle alive with her father's flammable liquids. This enabled Artemis to avenge her parents.

Ten years later, Shade mentions that Artemis is a member of the JSA.

Steven Sharpe / Gambler

Steven Sharpe / Gambler (season 1; guest season 3; portrayed by Eric Goins) is a member of the ISA and former leader of the No Limits Gang who is a master in the art of deception, wields a derringer, owns a pet cat, and is depicted as an enemy of Doctor Mid-Nite.

Steven Sharpe accompanies the Injustice Society in their attack on the Justice Society of America, during which he fought the JSA's leader Starman and was defeated by him.

10 years later, Sharpe is the CFO of The American Dream with an egocentric and cut-off personality. Sharpe meets with his Icicle to discuss whether Stargirl is a potential threat to their plans. Gambler later met with Sportsmaster and Tigress in their civilian identities to talk about the mission that involves him getting the data they need for Project: New America. Afterwards, the two of them scold Gambler for the littering he committed near them and demands that he picks up the discarded garbage which he does. Gambler's mission was a success with Sportsmaster and Tigress holding off the ISA. After assisting Icicle in making preparations, Sharpe helps the ISA enact Project: New America in the two-part episode, "Stars and S.T.R.I.P.E." However, after Stargirl's JSA foil their plans, he wipes the ISA's servers and escapes while his teammates are either killed or captured.

In season three, Gambler returns to Blue Valley after hearing about Eclipso's defeat. He tries to get the Whitmore-Dugan family and Shade to help locate his estranged daughter Rebecca to no avail. While searching for her online while writing a letter to her, Gambler discovers that someone has placed a surveillance system on specific parts of Blue Valley. Upon investigating one of them outside his trailer, Gambler is attacked by an unknown figure. Following Artemis defeating the No Limits Gang, the JSA go to Gambler's trailer to ask him about the No Limits Gang only to find Gambler dead with Shiv nearby with his derringer as she states that she wasn't the one who killed him. While Cindy works to break into Gambler's laptop, Mike and Jakeem learn from a wish made to Thunderbolt that Gambler's killer "has many names". A vision of Gambler appeared in the Shadowlands when Pat and Shade were sent there. It was discovered that Icicle and Ultra-Humanite were responsible for Gambler's death. After Icicle and Ultra-Humanite were defeated, Courtney delivered Gambler's letter to Rebecca.

 Eric Goins also voices Gambler's alarm counterpart on his laptop at the time when Shiv tries to get into Dragon King's files.

Solomon Grundy

Solomon Grundy is a towering zombie and member of the ISA.

Grundy accompanied the Injustice Society in their attack on the Justice Society of America's headquarters. He was sent after a fleeing Pat Dugan, who was evacuating a mortally wounded Starman, but failed to catch them.

In the ten years since the attack, Grundy has been kept under "The American Dream's" corporate headquarters in a reinforced cell to keep him under control, though he was released once to kill Hourman and his wife when they came too close to interfering with the Injustice Society.

By the present day however, Hourman's son Rick Tyler took up his father's mantle to seek revenge on Grundy. Though the two meet and fight in the season one finale, Rick spares Grundy's life and lets him go under the condition that he never returns.

In season two, Rick hears news about a "bear" breaking into restaurants for food. To avoid further incidents, Rick leaves some food in a specific part of the forest that Grundy was sighted in. Grundy later came out and shared some apples with Rick. Due to Eclipso's powers, Rick saw his uncle Matt as Grundy who supposedly killed a girl. After Rick was arrested and Matt was hospitalized, Grundy sadly watches from a far and quotes "friend". Grundy later assists the JSA in fighting Eclipso where he managed to beat him up before Eclipso blasts a hole in him. Following Eclipso's defeat, Rick buries him in front of an apple tree. Shade shows up stating that Grundy has a habit of returning from the dead at the right place at the right day.

In season three, Rick is trying to solve Shade's cryptic information on the right burial and time for Solomon Grundy. After Icicle and Ultra-Humanite's defeat, Rick visits where he buried Solomon Grundy as he finally comes back to life.

10 years later, Shade mentions that Solomon Grundy is a member of the JSA.

Anaya Bowin
Anaya Bowin (season 1; guest season 2; portrayed by Hina Kohan) is the principal of Blue Valley High School, a skilled violinist, the mother of Isaac Bowin, and secretly a member of the ISA. She is also the widow of the Fiddler.

In her first appearance, she drags Courtney away to deal with her after she shoved Henry King Jr. into a passing lunch lady. When Cindy calls Courtney a bitch in retaliation, Principal Bowin scolds Cindy for using such language. She later hosted an open house and even visited a comatose Brainwave in the hospital. When Icicle returned to Blue Valley, Bowin sent a text to him about Sportsmaster and Tigress killing another coach. Principal Bowin accompanied Gambler in obtaining a part for Project New America. In the season finale, Anaya gives her son some advice about his bullying problem by talking about her husband. When Anaya is sent to aid Sportsmaster and Tigress in hunting the Whitmore-Dugan family, she is killed by Tigress for insulting them like mentioning how they couldn't keep Artemis in line.

In season two, Anaya's death was covered up as a hunting accident and she was succeeded by Harold Sherman. She later appears in the Shadowlands.

Justin / Shining Knight

Justin / Shining Knight (season 1; portrayed by Mark Ashworth) is a mysterious janitor at Blue Valley High School with amnesia who is formerly a centuries-old vigilante, a knight from Camelot who carries Excalibur, and member of the Seven Soldiers of Victory.

Justin later uses his enchanted sword to save Stargirl from Cindy Burman. Justin receives recurring visions and seeks out Pat Dugan, Rick Tyler, and Beth Chapel for help. After hallucinating them as Dragon King and his drones, Pat talks Justin down and reveals to his allies the latter's true identity as Shining Knight. Justin assists the Justice Society of America in thwarting the Injustice Society's plans before leaving to find other surviving members of his team.

Isaac Bowin

Isaac Bowin (seasons 1–2; portrayed by Max Frantz) is a student at Blue Valley High School and the son of Anaya Bowin and the Fiddler. He is a savant musician. Before her untimely death at the hands of Tigress, Anaya gives some word of wisdom about his father when advising Isaac to deal with his bully problems. He fights his tormentor which is broken up by a teacher as Isaac stated that his mother advised him to do it.

In season two, he joins Cindy's Injustice Unlimited after she tells him about his parents' secret life. When Eclipso is freed, Isaac is consumed by him. He was listed as "missing" on the fliers. Isaac appeared with his mother in the Shadowlands.

Maria Carmen Saravia
Maria Carmen Saravia (portrayed by Maria Sager) is a waitress at Richie's Diner.

In season two, Maria becomes Yolanda's co-worker.

In season three, Maria took a while to perfect how Shade likes his tea. It is also shown that Zeek had developed a crush on her.

Joey Zarick
Joey Zarick (voiced by Wil Deusner) is the son of William Zarick and an aspiring magician. He was killed when Icicle caused him to be struck by an approaching vehicle. In season two, Joey appears in the Shadowlands with his family.

Travis Thomas
Travis Thomas (portrayed by Sam Brooks) is a tough jock at Blue Valley High School who is friends with Henry King Jr.

In season three, Travis and Brian try to demand money from Mike and Jakeem. After a wish to Thunderbolt to have them act nicer backfires, Cindy showed up and fought them off.

Brian Tanner Balloid
Brian Tanner Balloid (portrayed by Jasun Jabbar) is a jock at Blue Valley High School and one of Henry Jr.'s friends.

In season three, Brian and Travid try to demand money from Mike and Jakeem. After a wish to Thunderbolt to have them act nicer backfires, Cindy showed up and fought them off.

Bridget Chapel
Bridget Chapel (portrayed by Kron Moore) is the mother of Beth Chapel who works as a doctor at the Blue Valley Medical Center.

In season two, Bridget finds out about Beth's role as Doctor Mid-Nite following their encounter with Eclipso and supports her.

In season three, Bridget and James pitch ideas of a new Doctor Mid-Nite costume to Beth. She later helps heal Sylvester Pemberton at the sight of Gambler's murder when Charles McNider is called in. Beth later advised them to maintain their distance from her Doctor Mid-Nite activity since she doesn't want them to end up like Sylvester's sister Merry or Charles' daughter Rebecca. She and James later contact Beth to inform her about the combat features of her suit that Charles told them about. Bridget would later examine Rick. After the defeat of Icicle and Ultra-Humanite, Beth finally accepted her parents' help upon mentioning that she was tricked into keeping them away.

James Chapel
James Chapel (portrayed by Gilbert Glenn Brown) is the father of Beth Chapel and the husband of Bridget Chapel who works as a businessman at The American Dream.

In season two, James finds out about Beth's role as Doctor Mid-Nite following their encounter with Eclipso and supports her.

In season three, James and Bridget pitch ideas of a new Doctor Mid-Nite costume to Beth. Beth later advised them to maintain their distance from her Doctor Mid-Nite activity since she doesn't want them to end up like Sylvester's sister Merry or Charles McNider's daughter Rebecca. He and Bridget later contact Beth to inform her about the combat features of her suit that Charles told them about. After the defeat of Icicle and Ultra-Humanite, Beth finally accepted her parents' help upon mentioning that she was tricked into keeping them away.

Sofus Mahkent
Sofus Mahkent (portrayed by Jim France) is the father of Jordan and grandfather of Cameron who supports Jordan's campaign and also has cryokinetic powers. He helps to raise Cameron when Jordan is away.

In season two, Sofus and Lily continue to raise Cameron after Jordan's death as they talk about how Cameron is still interacting with Courtney after what happened to Jordan. Following Eclipso's defeat in the season finale and Cameron finishing his mural for his father, Sofus and Lily reveal their cryokinesis to Cameron.

In season three, Sofus and Lily offer a piece of advice to Cameron when his emerging cryokinesis is affecting his art skills. They advise him to give up art for a while. Sofus and Lily witness Cameron still interacting with Courtney. While Sofus was easy on it, Lily was secretly hostile about it. Sofus and Lily were later visited by Paul Deisinger about Cameron quitting art class. When Lily killed Paul, Sofus was surprised and had to dispose of his body offscreen. At the time when Rick stormed the Mahkent family's house to attack Cameron, Sofus engaged Beth in battle even when Artemis joined the fight. Sofus ended the conflicts in a draw stating that Jordan's evil did him in and then suffered a heart attack. With information from Bridget and James Chapel, Beth used the defibrilator in her gloves to restart his heart as 911 is called. After getting out of the hospital, Sofus tells Pat and Sylvester about how their people were hunted back in Europe. He and Lily were later visited by Crusher and Paula who advised them to forgive the ISA for what happened to Icicle. They were later reunited with a still-alive Icicle. During the fight between Ithe JSA and Icicle's family, Sofus and Beth could not bring themselves to fight each other again as they witness Lily accidentally getting crushed by a falling car. Following Icicle's defeat, Cameron takes Sofus away to get him medical help.

Lily Mahkent
Lily Mahkent (portrayed by Kay Galvin) is the mother of Jordan, the wife of Sofus, and the grandmother of Cameron who supports Jordan's campaign and also has cryokinetic powers. She helps to raise Cameron when Jordan is away.

In season two, Lily and Sofus continue to raise Cameron after Jordan's death as they talks about how Cameron is still interacting with Courtney after what happened to Jordan. She even advised Cindy to stay away from Cameron. Following Eclipso's defeat in the season finale and Cameron finishing his mural for his father, Lily and Sofus reveal their cryokinesis to Cameron.

In season three, Lily and Sofus offer a piece of advice to Cameron when his emerging cryokinesis is affecting his art skills. They advise him to give up art for a while. Sofus and Lily witness Cameron still interacting with Courtney. While Lily was hostile towards it, Sofus wasn't. Paul Deisinger later visited the Mahkents about Cameron quitting art class. Lily retaliated by killing Paul causing Sofus to dispose of his body offscreen. At the time when Rick stormed the Mahkent family's house to attack Cameron, Lily engaged Yolanda in battle. Sofus ended the conflicts in a draw stating that Jordan's evil did him in. Lily was shocked when Sofus suffered a heart attack as Beth uses the defibrilator in her gloves to restart his heart. When Lily paid a visit to Barbara, she was repelled by Paula. She and Sofus were later visited by Crusher and Paula who advised them to forgive the ISA for what happened to Icicle. After they left, Lily mourned Icicle. Lily, Sofus, and Cameron were later reunited with a still-alive Icicle. During the fight between the JSA and Icicle's family, Lily fought Wildcat. As she gets angered that Sofus won't fight Beth, she is accidentally crushed by a falling car.

Dr. Shiro Ito / Dragon King

Dr. Shiro Ito / Dragon King (season 1; guest season 2; portrayed by Nelson Lee) is a close ally of the ISA and the father of Cindy Burman. A controversial scientist who hides his reptilian face and experiments on himself and his patients. He was originally an Imperial Japanese war criminal from WWII who was supposedly executed for his crimes before secretly falling in with the ISA. Dragon King helped Ultra-Humanite by taking his brain out of Delores Winters and placing it in the body of an albino gorilla that was found by Congo Bill.

Dragon King meets with Icicle to discuss his support for the Injustice Society's plans involving a machine the latter is building and Shade betraying the group. While he considers late member Wizard to be vile, Dragon King gets Icicle's approval to obtain Wizard's body for further experiments. Dragon King is also concerned with the possibility of Brainwave's son Henry King Jr. developing powers of his own, to the point of forcing his daughter Cindy Burman to date King in order to keep watch over him. Dragon King's suspicions prove correct when Cindy fights Stargirl and King uses psychic powers to knock them down after getting caught in the crossfire. Stargirl leads the Justice Society of America in an attack on the Injustice Society's subterranean headquarters, during which they discover Dragon King had acquired reptilian traits. During the JSA's second attack on the Injustice Society, Dragon King is fatally wounded by Cindy who slashes him in the back.

In season two, Dragon King appears in Cindy's flashback watching her from the shadows. Then he appears in the Shadowlands with his drones where he tries to complete her.

In season three, Shiv, Mike, and Jakeem find Dragon King's body in one of his labs where its brain was removed. They find that it was placed inside Ultra-Humanite's albino gorilla body as he goes on the attack. While fighting the heroes, Dragon King is turned into a plush white gorilla by Jakeem Williams and Thunderbolt.

Zeek
Zeek (portrayed by King Orba) is the owner of a junkyard that Pat befriends when looking for scrap metal to make use of. He is also shown to be a fan of Dungeons & Dragons.

In season two, Zeek finds out about S.T.R.I.P.E. and starts to aid the JSA.

In season three, Zeek still helps out the JSA. He was also shown to develop a crush on Maria Carmen Saravia. Zeek later gives Jakeem advice at how he should perform a wish.

Maria Montez

Maria Montez (portrayed by Kikey Castillo) is Yolanda's Catholic mother and the wife of Juan. During Yolanda's high school days, Maria supported Yolanda in her run for school president until Cindy Burman leaked the topless photos of Yolanda that Henry King Jr. asked for. This incident caused Maria and Juan's relationship with Yolanda to be strained. Consumed by this incident, Maria and Juan grounded Yolanda where they have her head to her room upon getting home, no longer took her to church, or came near Blue Valley High School.  Following Yolanda's first outing as Wildcat, Maria and Juan scold her for being out of her room when she comes back into the house. Yolanda tries to get her parents to forgive her for the incident to no avail. Maria still claims that Yolanda has disgraced herself and the family while Juan sends Yolanda to her room.

In season two, Yolanda found Maria at the church. Maria scolds her for involving Father Thomas in her drama as Father Thomas talks Maria down while trying to get her to be a better parent. Maria does call for Yolanda when she sees an illusion of Henry King Jr. caused by Eclipso. Following the incident with Eclipso's illusion that caused Yolanda to quit being Wildcat and her job at Richie's diner, Courtney calls up the Montez house wanting to talk to Yolanda only for Maria to call Courtney a corrupting influence. Maria Carmen Saravia also calls up the Montez house telling Maria that Yolanda can have her job back when she is ready.

In season three, Yolanda persuades Maria to allow her to do late shifts at Richie's Diner. Maria only allows this because Juan lost his job while stating that the tips go to her college fund. She starts to get suspicious of Yolanda's secret activities. During a blackout caused by Beth, a more suspicious Maria confronted Yolanda in the house commenting that she's lucky her father didn't catch her. When Yolanda asks her to trust her, Maria states that she can't after the negative stuff she's done and advises her to either show her what's on her cell phone or move out. Yolanda went with the latter choice when she showed up at the Whitmore-Dugan home. Yolanda briefly called up Maria to let her know that she only lied to protect her. Following the defeat of Icicle and Ultra-Humanite, Yolanda calls her mother again stating that she still lied to protect her and that the truth can mend their relationship.

Introduced in season two

Jennie-Lynn Hayden

Jennie-Lynn Hayden (guest:season 2-present; portrayed by Ysa Penarejos as a teenager, Katie Swift as a young girl) is the daughter of Alan Scott / Green Lantern who grew up in an orphanage and seeks to reunite with her twin brother Todd Rice.

She breaks into Courtney Whitmore's home to retrieve her father Alan Scott's lantern, only to be attacked by Courtney. After Jennie introduces herself to Courtney and the latter's family, Courtney becomes skeptical of Jennie's intentions, believing she is a mole for the Injustice Society. As Pat Dugan trains Jennie to control her powers, which initially appear connected to Alan's lantern, Courtney eventually apologizes. After feeling isolated and emotional over her missing brother Todd Rice, Jennie breaks the lantern and strengthens her powers, after which Dugan theorizes Jennie herself is the source. Following this, Jennie leaves to find Rice, though Courtney and Dugan later recruit her to help them fight Eclipso. Courtney and Pat later find her in Civic City and a clue to where her brother is. While Jennie helped to repair the Black Diamond at the JSA's old Civic City headquarters, it attracted Eclipso who knocked Jennie down. Following a nightmare involving Eclipso taking control of Courtney, Jennie helps out in the final battle. When Eclipso is weakened, Jennie helps Stargirl in her attack as Thunderbolt turns Eclipso into a slice of toast. Afterwards, Jennie continues her search for her brother.

In season three, Jennie encounters Shade after accidentally burning down a tea house. Due to a fragment of a darkness energy being in Jennie's ring, it has been messing with the powers of Jennie's ring and Shade's shadow magic. They managed to trace Todd to the Helix Institute for Youth Rehabilitation and hide out in the basement as Shade brings Courtney and Pat to them. After learning about Todd, Courtney and Pat join them in making their way to Todd's room where Jennie melts the lock. When the siblings reunite and Todd mentions that he might destroy the world, Jennie grabs his hand which unleashes an energy that knocks everyone down and destroys the lights that Mister Bones and Nurse Louise Love have been using on Todd. Jennie was placed in a special room that withstood her ring's abilities. After Courtney persuaded Mister Bones to let Jennie help Todd, she has Shade take her and Todd to New York to meet up with Sandy Hawkins. It turns out he was the one whose "nightmares" directed Jennie to where Todd is and that she can help him control his "nightmares".

10 years later, Shade mentioned that Jennie is a member of the JSA under the title of Jade.

Richard Swift / Shade

Richard Swift / Shade (season 2; portrayed by Jonathan Cake) is an immortal supervillain who can generate and control shadows.

He used to be part of the ISA, though he did parley with Sylvester Pemberton about what should be done about Eclipso.

During the fight with the JSA during the holiday season in season one, Shade used his shadow attacks to drag Doctor Mid-Nite away. Shade later left upon considering Icicle's Project New America a "folly".

Following the thwarting of Project New America, Shade has resurfaced as a traveling collector of items to seek out the Black Diamond. After being confronted by Stargirl's JSA, Swift reveals his reasons for being with the ISA, denies killing Mid-Nite, and demands to be left alone, claiming he will leave peacefully once he gets what he wants. While a battle ensues, Swift subdues the heroes before escaping. In a later confrontation, he reveals to Stargirl that Eclipso murdered Mid-Nite's daughter Rebecca. After receiving help from Stargirl's mother Barbara Whitmore, Swift intervenes during a fight between the JSA and Injustice Unlimited in an attempt to destroy the Black Diamond. However, Stargirl inadvertently breaks it and frees Eclipso, who forces Swift to flee. Eventually, Swift resurfaces to aid Stargirl in reconstructing the Black Diamond, claiming it can be used to trap Eclipso once more. He later reveals his deception, using the diamond to strengthen his powers and summon Eclipso, who sends Stargirl to the Shadowlands. Subsequently, Swift seeks a darkened theater to recuperate as he watches The Picture of Dorian Gray. However, Barbara and her husband Pat Dugan find and convince him to open a portal to the Shadowlands so that Stargirl, Mid-Nite, and Cindy Burman can escape. The effort seemingly kills Swift, who dissipates in a cloud of dark energy. However, he later returns to help the JSA defeat Eclipso. After Rick digs a grave for Solomon Grundy, Shade tells Rick that Solomon Grundy had a way of returning from the dead.

In season three, Shade was approached by Gambler for help in finding Rebecca. Shade turns him away due to the fact that he once drained Shade's bank account after he departed from the ISA. Once Gambler was gone, Shade notices that something is off with his shadow abilities. After both bad encounters with Sylvester Pemberton with the latter encounter had him mentioning that Pat was the only one that attended his funeral, Shade briefly visits Rick and Beth stating that he is taking his leave from Blue Valley to attend to some other matters while noting that Rick hadn't been successful at getting Solomon Grundy back from the dead yet. When Rick asks him what he wants done with the body, Shade leaves without saying a word. Shade later returns to pick up Courtney while also dragging along Pat. He takes them to the basement of the Helix Institute where they meet up with Jennie. Due to a fragment of a darkness energy being in Jennie's ring, it has been messing with the powers of Jennie's ring and Shade's shadow magic as Shade mentioned that Jennie accidentally burned down a tea house that he was visiting. They managed to trace Todd to the Helix Institute for Youth Rehabilitation and hide out in the basement. After learning about Todd, Courtney and Pat join them in making their way to Todd's room where Jennie melts the lock. When the siblings reunite and Todd mentions that he might destroy the world, Jennie grabs his hand which unleashes an energy that knocks everyone down and destroys the lights that Mister Bones and Nurse Louise Love have been using on Todd. The shadow energies that Todd emitted sends Shade and Pat into the Shadowlands. Due to the energies of Jennie's ring interfering, Shade couldn't get himself and Pat out. It was also revealed that Shade was not present when his sister Emily died. Once Jennie gets Todd's abilities under control, Shade and Pat leave the Shadowlands. While holding Shade as an accessory to what happened to the original JSA, Pat persuades him to mentor Todd as he takes him and Jennie to meet up with Sandy Hawkins in New York.

10 years later, Shade is working as a tour guide at the JSA museum. He talks about how Sylvester Pemberton's brain was found and reunited with his body, the rescue of the other Seven Soldiers of Victory who were held captive by Nebula Man, the days when Jakeem Thunder, S.T.R.I.P.E. 2.0, Jade, Obsidian, Artemis, Sand, and Damage joining the JSA, a fight with an incarnation of the ISA, and Hourman and Doctor Mid-Nite's upcoming wedding. Just then, his tour is crashed by the arrival of Flash who enlists him to help the JSA deal with a threat.

Thunderbolt

Thunderbolt (voiced by Jim Gaffigan in season 2, Seth Green in Season 3) is 5th Dimension Genie that resides in a pink pen. He requires strict rules to grant wishes such as the user has to use specific wording when making a wish, Thunderbolt can't grant a wish that would kill anybody, he can't grant the same wish twice, and he can't grant a wish that would bring anyone back from the dead. According to Pat Dugan, Thunderbolt was a dangerous weapon. Thunderbolt and Johnny Thunder were with the Justice Society of America until they were attacked by the Injustice Society, during which Johnny was killed by Brainwave and Thunderbolt was left trapped in his pen for over 10 years after Johnny wished for him to return to it and wait for a new owner that was like him.

In season two, Mike gets ahold of the pen and befriends Thunderbolt. Following a confrontation with Shade however, Mike unknowingly wishes for the pen to end up in better hands, causing it to be teleported to his friend Jakeem Williams' house. Mike later found out about Jakeem owning Thunderbolt when larger foods started appearing in Blue Valley. Thunderbolt later assists Stargirl's JSA and their allies fight Eclipso where he tries to shock Eclipso. Jakeem later wishes for Eclipso to be toast causing Thunderbolt to turn Eclipso into toast during Stargirl and Jennie's final attack on him.

In season three, Thunderbolt emerges from his pen after Jakeem delivered the newspaper to Shade as he states to Jakeem that Shade still creeps him out and to pedal away from Shade's house faster. When Mike writes out a draft for Jakeem to use in wishing that they knew who killed Gambler, Thunderbolt spells out on the bathroom wall of Blue Valley High School that "the killer has many names". When Mike and Jakeem were threatened by Brian and Travis into giving them money, Thunderbolt grants a be nicer wish that backfires. Jakeem makes a wish to Thunderbolt for all the cameras that Gambler's murderer has touched. After Jakeem receives advice from Zeek on how a wish should be performed, Jakeem asks Thunderbolt if he has anything to add. Thunderbolt just claims that Zeek might be right. At a farm which was the site of one of Dragon King's old lairs. Thunderbolt was used to light the way until they are frightened away by a white gorilla. Thunderbolt's wish helps them get back into Blue Valley. He later tells Jakeem that he can't grant the ability to depower Icicle as Icicle's powers are keeping him alive while reminding Jakeem that he can't grant wishes that revolve around killing someone. During the fight against Dragon King in Ultra-Humanite's body, Thunderbolt grants Jakeem's wish to save Shiv by turning Dragon King into a white gorilla plush toy.

Guest stars

Introduced in season one
 Rex Tyler / Hourman (portrayed by Lou Ferrigno Jr.) - A member of the original JSA and the father of Rick Tyler who was "a master chemist and adrenaline junkie" with the ability to acquire super strength for one hour a day using a substance of his own invention in his hourglass amulet. When it came to the threat of Eclipso, Hourman and Wildcat voted to kill Bruce Gordon. Ten years prior to the series, Rex was with the Justice Society when the Injustice Society attacked their headquarters. He fought with Tigress before being defeated by Wizard. Having survived the attack, he and his wife Wendi tracked the Injustice Society to Blue Valley. They left their son Rick with Wendi's brother Matt before they were killed by Solomon Grundy while fleeing Blue Valley. Rick Tyler would go on to take up his father's mantle and amulet to avenge his parents.
 William Zarick / Wizard (portrayed by Joe Knezevich) - A member of the ISA who uses magic. Wizard partook in the ISA's attack on the Justice Society of America (JSA)'s headquarters, during which he defeated Hourman. Before he can attack Pat, Wizard was defeated by Starman. At some point afterwards, he claimed the Eclipso's Black Diamond.  In his civilian identity, Zarick works as a Blue Valley councilman as well as an executive and financial supporter of a prominent business called The American Dream, which is run by other former members of the Injustice Society. He is also the father of aspiring magician Joey Zarick and the husband of Denise Zarick. Having grown weary of his obligations to the ISA and wanting a normal life with his family, he rebuffs his former leader Icicle when he comes to seek help against Stargirl amidst her attempts to revive the JSA. After Joey is killed in an accident that Icicle caused, Zarick confronts him to avenge his son only to be frozen to death. Icicle's parents cover up his death by stating that he died of a heart attack as Jordan dedicates a theater in memory of him. After getting Icicle's approval, ISA member Dragon King obtains Wizard's body for experimentation purposes. Cindy Burman finds the Black Diamond in Zarick's storage unit.  In season two, he appears with his family in the Shadowlands.
 Mary Kramer (portrayed by Annie Thurman as a teenageer, Olivia Baughn as a young girl) - Courtney's best friend back in California.
 Maggie Kramer (portrayed by Elizabeth Bond) - The mother of Mary Kramer.
 Josh Hamman (portrayed by Christian Adam) - A nerd at Blue Valley High School.
 Mrs. Patterson (portrayed by Suehyla El-Attar) - A teacher at Blue Valley High School.
 Denise Zarick (portrayed by Cynthia Evans) - The wife of William Zarick and the mother of Joey Zarick. After William and Joey's deaths, Denise gets suspicious of her husband's death as he was in good health which she mentions to Pat. While looking for spare parts, Pat finds Denise's wrecked car with a magician's hat in it.  In season two, Denise appears in the Shadowlands with her family.
 Bobbie Burman (portrayed by Lesa Wilson) - The latest wife of Dragon King and the stepmother of Cindy. In season two, Bobbie is killed by Eclipso when he control's Cindy's body.
 Mercedes (portrayed by C.C. Castillo) - The housekeeper of the King family.
 Mr. Levine (portrayed by Nick Basta) - A math teacher at Blue Valley High School.
 Juan Montez (portrayed by Wilmer Calderon) - Yolanda's father. During Yolanda's high school days, Maria supported Yolanda in her run for school president until Cindy Burman leaked the topless photos of Yolanda that Henry King Jr. asked for. This incident caused Maria and Juan's relationship with Yolanda to be strained. Consumed by this incident, Maria and Juan grounded Yolanda where they have her head to her room upon getting home, no longer took her to church, or came near Blue Valley High School. Following Yolanda's first outing as Wildcat, Maria and Juan scold her for being out of her room when she comes back into the house. When Alex asks why they have to keep yelling as Yolanda, Juan tells him to be quiet. Yolanda tries to get her parents to forgive her for the incident to no avail. Juan sends Yolanda to her room. In season three, it is mentioned that Juan lost his job.
 Alex Montez (portrayed by Jonathan Blanco) - Yolanda's younger cousin and the nephew of Maria and Juan. He is on good terms with Yolanda and once asked his aunt and uncle why they have to keep yelling at her only for Juan to tell him to be quiet.
 Matt Harris (portrayed by Adam Aalderks) - The brother of Rex Tyler's wife Wendi and Rick Tyler's maternal uncle. He assumes guardianship of Rick after Rex and Wendi are killed by the ISA and developed an abusive relationship with him. In season two, Matt drives away Rick's teacher Miss Woods. Eclipso caused Rick to see Matt as Solomon Grundy who killed a little girl which placed Matt in critical condition. After closing the door to his hospital room and failing to reason with Matt, Pat had to do an unseen intimidation to get Matt to drop the charges on Rick. In season three, it is revealed that Matt has left Blue Valley for unknown reasons.
 Sam Kurtis (portrayed by Geoff Stults) - Courtney's father and Barbara's ex-boyfriend who attempts to reconnect with Courtney a decade after his disappearance. He resurfaces ostensibly to reconnect with his daughter Courtney Whitmore, though he secretly attempts to steal her locket and sell it off for money. However, her stepfather Pat Dugan realizes Kurtis' true intentions and confronts him telling him to never return.

Introduced in season two
 Rebecca McNider (portrayed by Olive Abercrombie) - The daughter of Charles McNider who became one of Eclipso's victims.
 Myra McNider (portrayed by Emily Dunlop) - The wife of Charles McNider.
 Harold Sherman (portrayed by Tywayne Wheatt) - The principal of Blue Valley High School who succeeds Anaya Bowin. After busting Courtney when she thought that Artemis was going to attack her, Sherman informs Pat and Barbara of this while mentioning that she will have to attend summer school after flunking one of her classes. When Deisinger undergoes a psych evaluation after what Eclipso did to him, Sherman takes over his class.
 Maggie Shaw (portrayed by Alicia Witt) - Pat's ex-wife and Mike's mother who tells Ultra-Humanite in Sylvester's body where Pat is. It is also revealed that Pat and Maggie weren't together long and Pat didn't find out about Mike until after they split up. They shared custody for a while, but Maggie was an addict, to the point that she abandoned him at a shelter. When she got arrested for possession, Pat got sole custody without a fight from her. Following the defeat of Icicle and Ultra-Humanite, Pat managed to arrange for Maggie to have some catching up to do with Mike.
 Miss Woods (portrayed by Deborah Bowman) - A teacher at Blue Valley High School.
 Paul Deisinger (portrayed by Randy Havens) - An art teacher at Blue Valley High School who oversees the summer school class that Courtney, Yolanda, Rick, and Isaac are in. Cindy Burman uses Eclipso to enchant Deisinger into painting until he becomes engulfed by a paint blob. When the Justice Society of America investigate, he causes them to see nightmares until Stargirl pulls him out of the paint blob, curing him of Eclipso's powers. Following this, Deisinger undergoes a psych evaluation. In season three, Paul is back to teaching his art class and using a cane to help with his recuperation.He later visits the Mahkent family's house to speak to Sofus and Lily about Cameron quitting art class. During the discussion, Lily angrily kills Paul by sending an icicle into his torso much to the dismay of Sofus who had to dispose of his body offscreen. A vigil was mentioned to have been held for him.
 Father Thomas (portrayed by Kenny Alfonso) - A priest at Blue Valley's church. He hears of Yolanda's mentioning that the Devil might be on Earth while also working to get Maria to be supportive of Yolanda's current drama.
 Johnny Thunder (portrayed by Ethan Embry) - A member of the original JSA who owned a pink pen that contained Thunderbolt. He was present at Rebecca McNider's funeral. During the holiday season where the ISA got back together, Johnny Thunder was at Pat's garage talking about how the JSA often have to clean up Thunderbolt's mess. Wildcat shows up to pick up Johnny Thunder when Solomon Grundy is seen with the ISA. Before leaving, Johnny Thunder states to Pat that they will have egg nog when he returns. This doesn't happen as he alongside Hawkman and Hawkgirl are killed offscreen by Brainwave. Before dying, Johnny Thunder made a wish to Thunderbolt that he'd find another person like him to bear the pink pen.
 Millie Myers (portrayed by Blaire Erskins) - The foster mother of Artemis Crock.
 Jay Garrick / Flash (portrayed by John Wesley Shipp) - A member of the original JSA with super-speed. Flash was present at the funeral of Rebecca McNider after she was killed by Eclipso and had to vote against killing Eclipso's host Bruce Gordon. During the ISA's attack on the JSA during the holiday season, Flash was taken down by Icicle as seen when his helmet has ice on it. 10 years after the defeat of Icicle and Ultra-Humanite in season three, Flash turns up alive as he crashes Shade's tour and enlists him into helping the JSA fight a threat. Shipp also played a version of Garrick in the Arrowverse series The Flash.
 Bruce Gordon (portrayed by Jason Davis) - An archaeologist who found the diamond that Eclipso was in on Diablo Island. After being possessed by Eclipso and having beaten Green Lantern, Spectre, Hawkman, and Hawkgirl, Starman had no choice but to kill Gordon and claim the diamond. Eclipso used an illusion of Gordon to torture Pat.
 Grumpy Joe (portrayed by Gregory Knowow) - A grouchy patron at Richie's Diner with an impatient personality.
 Louise Love (portrayed by Lynne Ashe) - The head nurse at the Helix Institute for Youth Rehabilitation. She was present when the police officers on Helix's side brought Todd Rice to her. She tells Todd about his father being Green Lantern as Todd also meets Mr. Bones. After being visited by Courtney, Pat, and Jennie, Louise contacted Mister Bones stating that they successfully moved Todd to another facilitiy while also mentioning that he has a sister. Following Eclipso's defeat, Nurse informed Mister Bones that Jennie is still looking for Todd and the sightings of superheroes and supervillains in Blue Valley. In season three, Nurse Love and Mister Bones have been working to keep Todd's powers in line using special lights in his room. She does trap Courtney in her office after the energy burst caused by Jennie and Todd. Due to Courtney's persuasion to Mister Bones, Nurse Love released Jennie to help Todd. She witnessed this success. Nurse Love denied any knowledge of spying on the JSA claiming that they did their research. There is some implication that she was a former teacher at one of Pat's old schools. During a discussion with Mister Bones, Nurse Love is informed that Courtney's convincing has persuaded him that they need to form a superhero team of their own.
 Sonia Sato (portrayed by Kristen Lee) - A civilian of Blue Valley who runs a coffee stand.
 Mister Bones (voiced by Keith David) - The director of the Helix Institute for Youth Rehabilitation with a transparent head that shows his skull and a cyanide touch that manifested when his mother gave birth to him. When Todd Rice was first brought to the institute by the police officers on Helix's side, Mister Bones introduced himself to Todd. He was informed by Louise Love about Todd being relocated and that he has a sister. Following Eclipso's defeat, Louise informed Mister Bones that Jennie is still looking for Todd and the sightings of superheroes and supervillains in Blue Valley. Mister Bones decides that he should pay a visit to Blue Valley. In season three, Mister Bones and Nurse Love have been working to keep Todd's powers in line using special lights in his room. While locked up in Nurse Love's office, Courtney meets Mister Bones and learns of his history. She persuades him not to hide his patients and to let Jennie help Todd. After that happens and Courtney departs with her group, Mister Bones tells Nurse Love that he has considered Courtney's advice and that it is time to form a superhero team of their own.

Introduced in season three
 Tim T. Tattle (portrayed by Todd Allen Durkin) - The new manager at the American Dream. He gave Barbara a hard time until Paula set him straight.
 Todd Rice / Obsidian (portrayed by Tim Gabriel as a teenager, Nate Swift as a child) - The son of Alan Scott and the twin brother of Jennie-Lynn Hayden who possesses umbrakinesis. After having been separated at a young age, Todd grew up separate from her and had a boyfriend named Danny. When his powers first manifested, he told Danny to get away when the police showed up. The police officers knew Todd's name and brought him to the Helix Institute for Youth Rehabilitation where they gave him to their ally Nurse Louise Love. While in the institute, Todd learned about his father as he also meets Mister Bones. Since his powers have been manifesting, Mister Bones and Nurse Love have been using special lights to keep them under control. This lasted until the day when Shade and Jennie tracked him to the Helix Institute for Youth Rehabilitation where Shade brought Courtney Whitmore and Pat Dugan to. When they find the room that Todd is in, he remembered Jennie and adivsed them not to free him or else his powers will destroy the world. Jennie grabs Todd's hand as they unleash an energy that knocks back everyone. Todd's shadowy form then sends Pat and Shade to the Shadowlands. Thanks to Courtney convincing Mister Bones to let Jennie help Todd get control of his abilities, Jennie uses her powers to help Todd control his powers enough for Pat and Shade to leave the Shadowlands. Pat persuades Shade to mentor Todd as Shade takes him and Jennie to New York to meet up with Sandy Hawkins. 10 years later, it was mentioned by Shade that Todd is a member of the JSA under the title of Obsidian.
 Danny Matthews (portrayed by Eddie Falshaw) - The boyfriend of Todd Rice. He used a closed restaurant for their dinner together. When Todd's powers first manifested, he told Danny to flee when the police arrived.
 Officer Andreyko (portrayed by David E. Collier) - A police officer who is secretly on the side of the Helix Institute for Youth Rehabilitation. He was the one who brought Todd to Nurse Love.
 Officer McFarlane (portrayed by Emmett Hunter) - A police officer and Officer Andreyko's partner who is secretly on the side of the Helix Institute for Youth Rehabilitation.
 Mr. Dugan (portrayed by G.W. Bailey) - The father of Pat Dugan and the grandfather of Mike Dugan. A vision of him is encountered in the Shadowlands.
 Tao Jones (portrayed by Andi Ju) - A patient at the Helix Institute for Youth Rehabilitation.
 Kritter - A dog and Tao's companion.
 Penny Dreadful (portrayed by Megan Ashley Brown) - A patient at the Helix Institute for Youth Rehabilitation.
 Carcharo - A beastly patient at the Healix Institute for Youth Rehabilitation who can be heard lurking in his room.
 James Rice (portrayed by Bolton Marsh) - The foster father of Todd Rice who disapproved of Todd being gay. He was seen in one of Todd's visions as his powers went out of control.
 Emily Swift (portrayed by Arianne Martin) - The sister of Shade. He wasn't there when Emily passed away. A vision of her appeared in the Shadowlands.
 Ultra-Humanite (voiced by an uncredited actor in the albino gorilla body, portrayed by Joel McHale in Starman's body) - A mad scientist's brain in an albino gorilla's body who is an old enemy of the JSA and an associate of Dragon King. The albino gorilla whose body was used was stolen from its location where Congo Bill had given it to. It is also claimed that he hates the ISA more than the JSA due to the fact that the ISA rejected his membership. In the present, after forming an alliance with Icicle and Dragon King, Ultra-Humanite transplanted his brain into Sylvester's body to manipulate Stargirl and her JSA into crippling themselves, and Dragon King's brain into Ultra-Humanite's albino gorilla body for him to "defeat" as Starman alongside Jordan's son. From there, he intends to run for president as a mouthpiece for Icicle to spread his ideals. Mike, Jakeem, and Thunderbolt encounter Dragon King at the site of one of his lairs. After they were scared off, Dragon King states "I'll destroy them all". When Sylvester and Pat learned of this from Mike and Jakeem, they told everyone about Ultra-Humanite which also involved his history of having his brain in the body of an actress named Delores Winters for a year. Icicle visited Dragon King in the forest and tells him that "it's time". After revealing this to a bound Pat, Ultra-Humanite starts to bury him alive. However, the JSA defeat the villains, with S.T.R.I.P.E. leaving the Ultra-Humanite brain damaged and on life support until Sylvester's body can be found.
 Delores Winters (portrayed by Meredith Garretson) - An actress whose body was briefly used by the Ultra-Humanite.
 Carver Colman (portrayed by James Andrew Kientzy) - An actor who presented Delores with an award during an award show.
 King Standish (portrayed by Allen Andrews) - A socialite who tried to make out with Delores after a party and was killed by her.
 Rebecca Sharpe (portrayed by Kelsey Rose Healey) - The daughter of Gambler. Following the defeat of Icicle and Ultra-Humanite, Courtney delivered Gambler's letter to her.

Notes

References

Lists of DC Comics television characters
Stargirl